The 1953 Coronation Honours were appointments by Queen Elizabeth II to various orders and honours on the occasion of her coronation on 2 June 1953. The honours were published in The London Gazette on 1 June 1953.

The recipients of honours are displayed here as they were styled before their new honour. They are arranged by honour, with classes (Knight, Knight Grand Cross, etc.) and then divisions (Military, Civil, etc.) as appropriate.

United Kingdom and the Commonwealth

Peerages

Viscounts 
 The Rt. Hon. Frederick Marquis, Baron Woolton  Chancellor of the Duchy of Lancaster since 1952; Minister of Food, 1940–1943; Minister of Reconstruction and member of War Cabinet, 1943–1945; Lord President of the Council, 1945 and 1951–1952; by the name, title and style of Viscount Woolton, of Liverpool in the County Palatine of Lancaster.

Barons 
 Sir Peter Bennett  Unionist Member of Parliament for Edgbaston since 1940. Parliamentary Secretary, Ministry of Labour and National Service, 1951–1952. For political and public services; by the name, style and title of Baron Bennett of Edgbaston, of Sutton Coldfield in the County of Warwick.
 Sir Ralph Glyn  Unionist Member of Parliament for Abingdon since 1924 and for Clackmannan and East Stirlingshire, 1918–1922. Chairman, Select Committee of House of Commons on Estimates since 1951. For political and public services; by the name, style and title of Baron Glyn, of Farnborough in the County of Berks.
 Sir Alfred Suenson-Taylor  President, London Liberal Party. For political and public services; by the name, style and title of Baron Grantchester, of Knightsbridge in the City of Westminster.

Privy Counsellors 
The Queen appointed the following to Her Majesty's Most Honourable Privy Council:
 Sir Edward Bridges 
 Sir Norman Brook 
 John Edwards 
 The Hon. Harold Holt
 The Hon. John McEwen
 Sir Patrick Spens

Baronetcies 
 Alfred Bossom 
 Sir Percy Mills 
 Sir Henry Price
 Major-General Sir Edward Spears 
 Sir Herbert Williams

Knights Bachelor 
 Stephen Cecil Armitage  Alderman, Nottingham City Council
 John Dunamace Heaton-Armstrong  Chester Herald
 Geoffrey Morris Barnett, For political and public services in Leicester.
 Dingwall Latham Bateson  President of the Law Society
 Alderman John William Bowen  Chairman of the North East Metropolitan Regional Hospital Board, and the National Health Service General Whitley Council
 John Bevan Braithwaite, Chairman, Council of the Stock Exchange
 Edward Crisp Bullard, Director, National Physical Laboratory, Department of Scientific and Industrial Research
 Sydney Camm  Director and Chief Designer, Hawker Aircraft, Ltd.
 Professor David Campbell  President of the General Medical Council
 George Norman Clark, Provost of Oriel College, Oxford. For services to the study of history.
 Bernard Henry Coode  Clerk of Committees, House of Commons
 Leonard Lumley Savage Dodsworth  For political and public services in York.
 Patrick William Donner  Conservative Member of Parliament for Basingstoke since 1935 and for West Islington, 1931–35. For political and public services.
 Walter James Drummond, Deputy Chairman, National Coal Board
 Edward Brown Ferguson, Chairman, British Insurance Association
 Major John Frederick Ferguson  Chief Constable, Kent County Constabulary
 Ernest Wensley Lapthorn Field  Director, Scottish Engineering Employers' Association
 Lionel Wray Fox  Chairman of the Prison Commission for England and Wales
 Arthur John Gielgud, Actor
 Colonel Louis Halle Gluckstein  Conservative Member of Parliament for East Nottingham, 1931–45. For political and public services.
 Stuart Coldwell Goodwin  For political and public services in Sheffield
 David Edward Griffiths  Vice-Chairman of the Executive Committee, Royal Air Force Cinema Corporation
 Alderman William Josiah Grimshaw  For political and public services in Middlesex
 Kenneth George Grubb  President of the Church Missionary Society
 John Berry Hobbs, For services to cricket.
 The Honourable Francis John Hopwood, Managing Director, Shell Transport and Trading Company, Ltd.
 Harry Hyde  For political and public services in Lancashire.
 Hugh Nicholas Linstead  Conservative Member of Parliament for Putney since 1942. For political and public services.
 George Donald Alastair MacDougall  Chief Adviser, Statistical Branch, Office of the Paymaster General
 William Neil McKie  Organist and Master of the Choristers, Westminster Abbey
 Major Sydney Frank Markham  Conservative Member of Parliament for Buckingham since 1951; for South Nottingham (National), 1935–1945; and for Chatham (Labour), 1929–31. For political and public services.
 Alderman James Marshall  For political and public services in Croydon.
 Frederick Messer  Chairman, Central Health Services Council. Lately Chairman, North West Metropolitan Regional Hospital Board
 Charles Richard Morris, Vice-chancellor, University of Leeds
 John Spencer Muirhead  President of the Law Society of Scotland
 Andrew Naesmith  General Secretary, Amalgamated Weavers' Association
 James Henry Norritt  Lord Mayor of Belfast
 Lieutenant-Colonel Grismond Picton Philipps  For political and public services in Carmarthenshire.
 Alderman Theodore Beal Pritchett  For political and public services in Birmingham.
 Stanley Walter Rawson, Director-General of Machine Tools, Ministry of Supply
 Gordon Richards, For services to horse racing in Great Britain.
 Alfred Road  Chief Inspector of Taxes, Board of Inland Revenue
 Francis Martin Rouse Walshe  President, Royal Society of Medicine. Consulting Physician to University College Hospital, London
 George Alexander Williamson  For political and public services in Aberdeenshire.

Queensland, Australia 
 Raymond Douglas Huish, of Queensland, Australia, president of the Queensland Branch of the Returned Services League.

South Australia 
 The Honourable Shirley Williams Jeffries, of the State of South Australia. For public services.
 The Honourable Geoffrey Sandford Reed, Judge of the Supreme Court, State of South Australia

Tasmania 
 Eric Ernest von Bibra  Agent-General in London for the State of Tasmania

Southern Rhodesia 
 Andrew Henry Strachan  Secretary to the Treasury, Southern Rhodesia

Colonies, Protectorates, etc. 
 Malcolm Palliser Barrow  For public services in Nyasaland.
 Ewen MacGregor Field Fergusson  For public services in Singapore.
 Mehmed Halid Bey. For public services in Cyprus.
 Donald Edward Jackson, Colonial Legal Service, Chief Justice of the Windward and Leeward Islands.
 Edwin Frank McDavid  lately Financial Secretary and Treasurer, British Guiana
 Charles Mathew Colonial Legal Service, Chief Justice, Federation of Malaya
 Roland Welensky  For public services in Northern Rhodesia.

The Most Honourable Order of the Bath

Knights Grand Cross (GCB)

Military Division 
 Admiral Sir George Elvey Creasy 
 General Sir Charles Frederic Keightley  late Royal Armoured Corps. Colonel, 5th Royal Inniskilling Dragoon Guards
 General Sir Ouvry Lindfield Roberts  late Corps of Royal Engineers. Colonel Commandant, Corps of Royal Engineers
 Air Chief Marshal Sir Hugh William Lumsden Saunders  Royal Air Force

Civil Division 
 The Right Honourable Sir Alan Frederick Lascelles  Private Secretary to The Queen
 Sir William Strang  Permanent Under-Secretary of State, Foreign Office

Knights Commander (KCB)

Military Division 
 Vice-Admiral Edmund Walter Anstice 
 Air Marshal Sir Francis Joseph Fogarty  Royal Air Force
 Air Marshal Sir Ronald Ivelaw-Chapman  Royal Air Force
 General (temporary) Sir Eric Garden Robert Mansergh  late Royal Regiment of Artillery. Colonel Commandant, Royal Regiment of Artillery
 Lieutenant-General (temporary) Harold Redman  late Infantry. Colonel, The King's Own Yorkshire Light Infantry
 Vice-Admiral Peveril Barton Reiby Wallop William-Powlett

Civil Division 
 Sir John Douglas Cockcroft  Chairman, Defence Research Policy Committee and Scientific Adviser to the Minister of Defence. Director, Atomic Energy Research Establishment
 Commander (S) Sir Dudley Colles  Royal Navy (Retired), Deputy Treasurer to The Queen and Assistant Keeper of the Privy Purse
 Gilbert Nicolson Flemming  Permanent Secretary, Ministry of Education
 Sir Robert Uchtred Eyre Knox  Ceremonial Officer, H.M. Treasury
 Sir Owen Frederick Morshead  Librarian to The Queen, Windsor Castle
 Sir John Armitage Stainton  Counsel to the Chairman of Committees, House of Lords

Companions (CB)

Military Division 
 Rear-Admiral Geoffrey Barnard 
 The Venerable Archdeacon Frank Noel Chamberlain  Chaplain of the Fleet
 Major-General Richard Frank Cornwall  Royal Marines
 Rear-Admiral Norman Vincent Dickinson 
 Rear-Admiral John Willson Musgrave Eaton 
 Rear-Admiral Arthur Gordon Voules Hubback 
 Rear-Admiral (E) Alexander Davidson McGlashan 
 Commodore Arthur Ian Robertson 
 Rear-Admiral Robert St. Vincent Sherbrooke 
 Commodore Courtenay Alexander Rives Shillington 
 Brigadier Alexander Meister Astruther  late Corps of Royal Engineers
 Brigadier George Rowley Bradshaw  late Royal Regiment of Artillery
 Major-General Edwyn Harland Wolstenholme Cobb  late Corps of Royal Engineers
 Major-General Joseph Clinton Collins  late Royal Army Medical Corps
 Major-General Ralph Cyril Cruddas  late Infantry
 Major-General William James Fitzpatrick Eassie  late Royal Army Service Corps
 Major-General Frederick Knowles Escritt  late Royal Army Medical Corps
 Major-General Cecil Llewellyn Firbank  late Infantry
 Major-General Reginald Peregrine Harding  late Royal Armoured Corps
 Colonel Leslie Innes Jacques  late Corps of Royal Engineers
 Major-General James Mansergh Wentworth Martin  late Royal Armoured Corps
 The Reverend Canon Victor Joseph Pike  Chaplain-General to the Forces (53409), Royal Army Chaplains' Department
 Major-General (temporary) Walter Henry Dennison Ritchie  late Royal Army Service Corps
 Major-General Dennis Charles Tarrant Swan  late Corps of Royal Engineers
 Brigadier and Chief Paymaster Frederick Christian Williams  Royal Army Pay Corps
 Air Vice-Marshal George David Harvey  Royal Air Force
 Air Vice-Marshal Walter Hugh Merton  Royal Air Force
 Air Commodore Adolphus Dan Davies  Royal Air Force
 Air Commodore Hector Douglas McGregor  Royal Air Force
 Air Commodore John Marson  Royal Air Force
 Air Commodore Thomas Bain Prickman  Royal Air Force
 Group Captain David John Pryer Lee  Royal Air Force
 Group Captain John Gilbert Davis  Royal Air Force

Civil Division 
 John Anderson, Deputy Secretary, Scottish Home Department
 Philip Austin Browne, Chief Inspector, Ministry of Education
 Air Vice-Marshal Willett Amalric Bowen Bowen-Buscarlet  Chairman, East Lancashire Territorial and Auxiliary Forces Association
 Robert Cockburn  Scientific Adviser to the Air Ministry
 George Peter Humphreys-Davies, Under-Secretary, H.M. Treasury
 Martin Teall Flett, Under-Secretary, H.M. Treasury
 Isidore Graul  Under-Secretary, Ministry of Food
 John French Greenwood, Undersecretary, Central Land Board and War Damage Commission
 John Hastings James, Under-Secretary, Admiralty
 Eric Malcolm Jones  Foreign Office
 Ernest Turner Jones  Principal Director of Scientific Research (Air), Ministry of Supply
 Evan Bonnor Hugh-Jones  Chief Engineer, Highways Engineering Staff, Ministry of Transport
 George Herbert Edmeston Parr  Comptroller and Auditor-General, Northern Ireland
 John Edward Pater, Under-Secretary, Ministry of Health
 John Alfred Ralph Pimlott, Under-Secretary, Ministry of Materials
 Jack Stafford, Director of Statistics, Board of Trade
 William Thomas, Under-Secretary, Welsh Office, Ministry of Housing and Local Government
 Brigadier Alfred Cedric Cowan Willway  Lately Chairman, Territorial and Auxiliary Forces Association of the County of Surrey
 Norman Egerton Young  Comptroller-General, National Debt Office

Royal Victorian Chain 
 His Grace Bernard Marmaduke, Duke of Norfolk 
 His Grace Henry Hugh Arthur Fitzroy, Duke of Beaufort

Royal Victorian Order

Dames Grand Cross (GCVO) 
 Her Royal Highness The Princess Margaret 
 Her Highness Princess Marie Louise 
 The Right Honourable Mabell Frances Elizabeth, Dowager Countess of Airlie

Knights Grand Cross (GCVO) 
 Field Marshal the Right Honourable Alan Francis, Viscount Alanbrooke 
 The Most Reverend and Right Honourable Geoffrey Francis Fisher, Lord Archbishop of Canterbury
 The Most Honourable George Horatio Charles, Marquess of Cholmondeley
 Admiral Sir John Hereward Edelsten 
 Air Chief Marshal Sir William Elliot  Royal Air Force
 The Right Honourable Sir David Patrick Maxwell Fyfe 
 Colonel Sir Dermot McMorrough Kavanagh 
 Major Sir Arthur Horace Penn 
 The Right Honourable Lawrence Roger, Earl of Scarbrough 
 Sir Harold Richard Scott

Dames Commander (DCVO) 
 The Right Honourable Dorothy Evelyn Augusta, Countess of Halifax 
 The Right Honourable Patricia, Viscountess Hambleden
 The Right Honourable Cynthia Ellinor Beatrix, Countess Spencer

Knights Commander (KCVO) 
 Sir Arnold Edward Trevor Bax
 The Honourable Sir George Rothe Bellew 
 Sir John Reginald Hornby Nott-Bower 
 Rear-Admiral Sir Arthur Bromley 
 Lieutenant-General Sir Frederick Arthur Montague Browning 
 Colonel Geoffrey Ronald Codrington 
 Major The Honourable John Spencer Coke 
 Sir Rupert de la Bère 
 Cedric Drewe 
 The Right Honourable David McAdam Eccles 
 Sir Harold Corti Emmerson 
 Major-General Randle Guy Feilden 
 Major-General Arthur Guy Salisbury-Jones 
 Sir Percivale Liesching 
 Edgar William Light 
 Major Philip Reginald Margetson 
 Henry Austin Strutt

Commanders (CVO) 
 (William) Godfrey Agnew
 Lieutenant-Colonel Francis Cecil Campbell Balfour 
 Roderick Edward Barclay 
 Eric Bedford
 Lieutenant-Colonel Ralph Charles Bingham 
 Major Alastair Campbell Blair 
 John Dykes Bower
 Commander (S) Richard Colville  Royal Navy (Retired)
 Roger John Edward Conant 
 Captain Oliver Payan Dawnay
 Jean Frances, The Honourable Mrs. Andrew Elphinstone
 The Reverend Maurice Frederic Foxell 
 Lady Constance Harriet Stuart Milnes-Gaskell
 Lady Margaret Katherine Hay
 Captain Humphrey Clifford Lloyd 
 John Nigel Loring 
 Ivison Stephenson Macadam 
 Walter Howard Nevill 
 Osborne Harold Peasgood
 David Bruce Pitblado
 William George Pottinger
 Alderman Charles Pearce Russell 
 Henry Gray Studholme 
 Lawrence Edward Tanner 
 Burke St. John Trend
 Lieutenant-Colonel The Honourable Osbert Eustace Vesey 
 Anthony Richard Wagner
 Lady Victoria Alexandrina Violet Wemyss

Fourth Class 
 James Lawrence Bunting Ansell 
 The Reverend Prebendary Edward Harold Williams-Ashman
 William Bishop 
 Lieutenant-Colonel The Honourable Martin Michael Charles Charteris 
 Eugene John Cruft
 Percival Thorne Fielding 
 Norman Bishop Hartnell
 Colonel Sir Edward Philip Le Breton
 Major James Rennie Maudslay 
 Major Mark Vane Milbank 
 Oliver Millar
 Major Robert Alfred O'Brien 
 Lieutenant-Colonel (Director of Music) Meredith Roberts 
 Major Charles Murray Kennedy St. Clair (The Master of Sinclair)
 Norman Leslie Swift 
 Lieutenant-Colonel John Riddell Bromhead Walker 
 Major Charles Ernest Walter

Fifth Class 
 Margaret Barron
 Winifred Maud Bateson
 David Vincent Griffiths Buchanan
 Walter Harry Dobson 
 William Frederick Fryer
 Edmund Frank Grove
 William John Hepburn 
 Robert George Stegmaun Hoare 
 Mary Felicity Colquhoun Irvine
 Victoria Florence Laflin
 Margaret McKay MacDonald
 Cyril Arnett Waud
 Allan Green Wickens

Order of Merit (OM) 
 Walter John De La Mare

The Most Distinguished Order of Saint Michael and Saint George

Knights Grand Cross (GCMG) 
 Major-General Sir John Noble Kennedy  Governor and Commander-in-Chief of Southern Rhodesia
 Sir John Gilbert Laithwaite  High Commissioner in Pakistan for Her Majesty's Government in the United Kingdom
 General Sir Gerald Walter Robert Templer  High Commissioner, Federation of Malaya

Honorary Knight Grand Cross
 Sultan Abu Bakar Ri'ayatu'd-Din Al-Mu'adzam Shah  ibni Al-Marhum Al-Mu'tasim Billah Al-Sultan Abdullah. His Highness the Sultan of Pahang, Federation of Malaya.

Knights Commander (KCMG) 
 Lieutenant-General Sir James Bennett Hance  Medical Adviser and President, Medical Board, Commonwealth Relations Office
 Harold Graham Vincent  Secretary, Government Hospitality Fund
 Frederick Crawford  Governor and Commander-in-Chief, Seychelles
 Robert de Zouche Hall  Governor and Commander-in-Chief, Sierra Leone
 Tom Hickinbotham  Governor and Commander-in-Chief, Aden
 Stephen Elliot Vyvyan Luke  Comptroller for Development and Welfare in the West Indies and British Co-Chairman of the Caribbean Commission
 Douglas Frederick Howard  Her Majesty's Ambassador Extraordinary and Plenipotentiary in Montevideo
 Frank Kenyon Roberts  Deputy Under-Secretary of State, Foreign Office
 Sir James Wilson Robertson  Civil Secretary, Sudan Government
 Geoffrey Arnold Wallinger  Her Majesty's Ambassador Extraordinary and Plenipotentiary at Bangkok

Honorary Knight Commander
 Sultan Omar Ali Saifuddin  ibni Almerhom Sultan Mohamed Jemalulalam, His Highness the Sultan of Brunei.

Companions (CMG) 
 Major Edward Beddington-Behrens  For services to the Economic League for European Co-operation
 Amos John Cooke, Head of British Food Mission in the Argentine Republic
 James Durward, Deputy Director, Meteorological Office, Air Ministry
 Robert Ernest Hardingham  Secretary and Chief Executive, Air Registration Board
 George Macdonald  Professor of Tropical Hygiene, University of London, and Director of the Ross Institute of Tropical Hygiene
 Christopher Thomas Saunders, Deputy Director, Central Statistical Office, Cabinet Office
 Matthew Stevenson, Assistant Secretary, H.M. Treasury
 Colonel Granville Walton  (Retired), Oversea Commissioner, Boy Scouts Association
 Kenneth Clinton Wheare, Gladstone Professor of Government and Public Administration, University of Oxford
 Roger Boulton Willmot, Senior Trade Commissioner, New Zealand
 George James Armstrong  Government Secretary, Basutoland
 The Honourable George Arthur Davenport, Minister of Mines and Transport, and Minister of Education, Southern Rhodesia
 Brigadier Thomas Charles Eastick  President of the South Australian Branch of the Returned Sailors', Soldiers' and Airmen's League
 Horace Algernon Fraser Rumbold  an Assistant Secretary in the Commonwealth Relations Office and recently Deputy High Commissioner for the United Kingdom in the Union of South Africa
 Eric John Carl Stopp  Official Secretary to the Governor, State of Tasmania, for many years
 James Thomson  Deputy High Commissioner for the United Kingdom in Canada
 Arthur Grenfell Clarke, Colonial Administrative Service, Financial Secretary, Hong Kong
 Robert Herbert Keppel-Compton, Colonial Administrative Service, Provincial Commissioner, Nyasaland
 Walter Fleming Coutts  Colonial Administrative Service, Administrator, St. Vincent, Windward Islands
 Arthur Norman Galsworthy. Chief Secretary, West African Inter-Territorial Secretariat
 Ronald Ernest German, Colonial Postal Service, Postmaster General, East African Posts and Telegraphs Department, East Africa High Commission
 Noel Hedley Vicars-Harris, Colonial Administrative Service, Member for Lands and Mines, Tanganyika
 Carruthers Melvill Johnston, Colonial Administrative Service, Provincial Commissioner, Kenya
 Charles Ernest Lalbert, Assistant Secretary, Colonial Office
 Patrick Donald Macdonald, Colonial Administrative Service, Colonial Secretary, Leeward Islands
 Thomas Percy Fergus McNeice  Colonial Administrative Service, President, City Council, Singapore
 Lionel Armine Mathias, Colonial Administrative Service, Labour Commissioner, Uganda
 John Archibald Mulhall  Colonial Administrative Service, Chairman, Public Service Commission, Gold Coast
 Robert Newton, Colonial Administrative Service, Financial Secretary, Jamaica
 Cecil Rex Niven  Colonial Administrative Service, Senior Resident, Nigeria
 Geoffrey Walter Nye  Deputy Agricultural Adviser to the Secretary of State for the Colonies
 David Charles Watherston, Colonial Administrative Service, Chief Secretary, Federation of Malaya
 Edward Henry Windley, Colonial Administrative Service, Provincial Commissioner, Kenya
 Colonel Arthur Edwin Young. For services as Commissioner of Police, Federation of Malaya
 Richard Hugh Sedley Allen, Minister at Her Majesty's Embassy in Buenos Aires
 Harold Beeley  Counsellor at Her Majesty's Embassy in Washington
 John Wheeler Wheeler-Bennett  Historical Adviser to the Special Historical Section (Captured German Archives) of the Foreign Office Library
 Henry Norman Brain  Inspector of Her Majesty's Foreign Service Establishments
 Rolland Alfred Aimé Chaput de Saintonge, Head of the German Information Department, Foreign Office
 Carlton Griffith Davies  Sudan Agent in London
 Charles Howard Ellis  Foreign Office
 William Harpham  lately Head of the General Department, Foreign Office
 Charles Hepburn Johnston, Political Director, Office of the United Kingdom High Commissioner, Wahnerheide
 Richard Geoffrey Austin Meade, Her Majesty's Consul-General at Marseilles
 John Bennet Lorimer Munro, lately Chief Administrative Officer, Control Commission for Germany (British Element)
 Cecil Cuthbert Parrott  Counsellor at Her Majesty's Embassy in Brussels
 Ivor Thomas Montague Pink, lately Deputy to the Permanent United Kingdom Representative on the Organisation for European Economic Co-operation in Paris
 Archibald David Manisty Ross, Head of the Eastern Department, Foreign Office
 Sir Horace Anthony Claude Rumbold  Counsellor at Her Majesty's Embassy in Paris

Honorary Companion
 Alhaji the Honourable Usuman Nagogo  Emir of Katsina, Nigeria.

The Most Excellent Order of the British Empire

Knights Grand Cross (GBE)

Military Division 
 Admiral The Honourable Sir Guy Herbrand Edward Russell 
 General Sir Frank Ernest Wallace Simpson  late Corps of Royal Engineers. Colonel Commandant, Royal Pioneer Corps
 Air Chief Marshal Sir Hugh Pughe Lloyd  Royal Air Force

Civil Division 
 Sir Alexander Knox Helm  Her Majesty's Ambassador Extraordinary and Plenipotentiary in Ankara
 Sir Hilary Rudolph Robert Blood  Governor and Commander-in-Chief, Mauritius

Honorary Knight Grand Cross
 Abubakar  Sultan of Sokoto, Nigeria

Dames Commander (DBE)

Military Division 
 Brigadier Mary Frances Coulshed  late Women's Royal Army Corps

Civil Division 
 Lady Helen Violet Bonham Carter, Past President of the Liberal Party Organisation and of the Women's Liberal Federation. For political and public services.
 Lady Helen Cynthia Colville  For social work, including services to the welfare of mothers and children.
 Catherine Fulford  For political and public services in London.
 Flora MacLeod of MacLeod. For social and public services in Scotland
 Enid Mary Russell Russell-Smith, Under-Secretary, Ministry of Health

Knights Commander (KBE)

Military Division 
 Vice-Admiral Charles Thomas Mark Pizey 
 Vice-Admiral Albert Lawrence Poland 
 Major-General Cecil Norbury Bednall  Royal Army Pay Corps
 Lieutenant-General John Dane Woodall  late Royal Regiment of Artillery
 Air Marshal Robert Owen Jones  Royal Air Force
 Acting Air Marshal James MacConnell Kilpatrick

Civil Division 
 Robert John Graham Boothby  Unionist Member of Parliament for East Aberdeenshire since 1924. Parliamentary Secretary, Ministry of Food, 1940–41. A delegate to Consultative Assembly of Council of Europe since 1949. For political and public services.
 John Anthony Carroll, Deputy Controller (Research and Development), Admiralty
 Frank Wyndham Hirst  Public Trustee
 The Honourable Arthur Jared Palmer Howard  Chairman of the Teaching Hospitals Association
 Alexander Johnston  Third Secretary, H.M. Treasury
 Dudley Owen Lumley  Deputy Director General, General Post Office
 Sir Greville Simpson Maginness, Chairman, Churchill Machine Tool Company, Ltd., Manchester
 Major-General William Godwin Michelmore  Chairman, Territorial and Auxiliary Forces Association of the County of Devon
 Sir Charles Johns Mole  Director-General of Works, Ministry of Works
 Sir Frederick Ernest Rebbeck  Chairman and Managing Director, Harland and Wolff, Ltd., Belfast
 John Garnett Lomax  Her Majesty's Ambassador Extraordinary and Plenipotentiary in La Paz
 Norman Stanley Roberts  Minister (Commercial) at Her Majesty's Embassy in Tokyo
 Professor Hugh Stott Taylor, Professor of Chemistry and Dean of the Graduate School at Princeton University, United States of America
 Charles Alexander Innes, President, Bengal Chamber of Commerce and Industry, and the Associated Chambers of Commerce of India, 1952–53
 Hugo Frank Marshall  Colonial Administrative Service, Lieutenant-Governor, Western Region, Nigeria
 Clement John Pleass  Colonial Administrative Service, Lieutenant-Governor, Eastern Region, Nigeria

Honorary Knights Commander
 Dato Onn bin Ja'afar, Member for Home Affairs, Federation of Malaya
 Raja Uda  bin Raja Muhammad, Mentri Besar, Selangor, Federation of Malaya
 Mallam Yahaya  Emir of Gwandu, Nigeria

Commanders (CBE)

Military Division 
 Rear-Admiral (E) Robert Cobb 
 Jeannie Kathleen Gillanders  Matron-in-Chief, Queen Alexandra's Royal Naval Nursing Service
 Colonel Joseph Thomas Hall  Royal Marines
 Captain Roy Carlton Harry  Royal Navy
 Captain (E) Phillip Daniel Oliver, Royal Navy (Retired)
 Colonel John Markham Phillips, Royal Marines
 Superintendent Nancy Margaret Robertson  Women's Royal Naval Service
 Captain Raymond Maurice Trevelyan Taylor, Royal Navy (Retired) (serving with the Indian Navy as Commodore-in-Charge, Bombay)
 Surgeon Captain Samuel Gerald Weldon  Royal Navy
 Captain (S) Albert Stanley Wiggett  Royal Navy
 Brigadier (temporary) Richard Hugh Barry  late Infantry
 Brigadier George Alexander Bond  late Royal Army Service Corps
 Brigadier (temporary) Robert Gilbert Trimingham Collins, Employed List I (late The Gloucestershire Regiment)
 Brigadier Brian Daunt  late Royal Regiment of Artillery
 Brigadier Francis Charles Widenham Fosbery, late Corps of Royal Engineers
 Major-General Philip Le Marchant Stonhouse Stonhouse-Gostling, late Royal Regiment of Artillery
 Brigadier (formerly Major-General (temporary)) Cecil Hay Gurney  late Infantry
 Brigadier (temporary) John Winthrop Hackett  late Royal Armoured Corps
 Colonel Richard Clarence Halse 
 Brigadier Andrew George Heveningham  late Royal Army Veterinary Corps
 Colonel (temporary) Godfrey Pennington Hobbs  The Royal Northumberland Fusiliers
 Colonel Hilary Leonard Lewis, late Royal Corps of Signals
 Lieutenant-Colonel (formerly Colonel (temporary)) Temple Morris  Royal Army Ordnance Corps
 Brigadier Henry Albert Potter, late Royal Army Service Corps
 Colonel (acting) Dudley Gethin Bramley Ridout  Army Cadet Force
 Brigadier (temporary) John Michael Kane Spurling  late Infantry
 Colonel (temporary) Hugh Penry Whitefoord, Royal Regiment of Artillery
 Colonel Thomas Ernest Williams, late Infantry
 Brigadier (temporary) Reginald Edward Holloway  late Corps of Royal Engineers, at present on loan to the Government of India
 Colonel Robert Edward Beaumont Long  Southern Rhodesia Military Forces
 The Reverend Alan Stanley Giles  Royal Air Force
 Air Commodore Frederick Elvy Lipscomb  Royal Air Force
 Air Commodore Patrick Brunton Lee Potter  Royal Air Force
 Acting Air Commodore Wilfrid Ewart Oulton  Royal Air Force
 Acting Air Commodore Walter Allan Stagg  Royal Air Force
 Group Captain Cyril Edgar Joseph Baines, Royal Air Force
 Group Captain Vyvian George Anthony Bennett, Royal Air Force
 Group Captain Leslie Crocker, Royal Air Force
 Group Captain Edward Mortlock Donaldson  Royal Air Force
 Group Captain Noel Challis Hyde, Royal Air Force
 Group Captain Gwilym Laugharne Sloane Griffith-Jones  Royal Air Force
 Group Captain Bruce Robinson, Royal Air Force
 Group Captain Richard Stephen Ryan, Royal Air Force
 Group Captain Edward John Herbert Starling, Royal Air Force
 Group Captain John Arthur Charles Stratton  Royal Air Force

Civil Division 
 Alfred Agar, Chairman and Managing Director, Davidson and Company, Ltd., Belfast
 John Russell Willis Alexander, Chairman, Westminster Local Employment Committee
 Jeannette Eleanor Altwegg. For services to amateur skating.
 Hugh Arrowsmith, Independent Member of the Raw Cotton Commission
 Alice Martha Bacon  Labour Member of Parliament for North-East Leeds since 1945. Chairman of the Labour Party, 1950. For political and public services.
 Richard George Baker, Deputy Chairman, North Eastern Division, National Coal Board
 Edmund Bruce Ball, Managing Director, Glenfield and Kennedy, Ltd., Kilmarnock
 John Garnett Banks  lately City Treasurer, Edinburgh
 William George Barnard  Professor of Pathology, University of London
 Alderman Albert David Bartlett  For political and public services in Lewisham.
 Frederick Sherbrooke Barton, Principal Director of Electronic Research and Development, Ministry of Supply
 Harry Bateman. For political and public services in Lincolnshire.
 Edward Fetherstonhaugh Batten  For political and public services in Devon.
 Joseph Bell, Chief Constable, Manchester City Police Force
 Alderman William James Bennett  Chairman, Essex County Council. For services during the recent floods in the Eastern Counties.
 MacAlister Bexon, President, The British Furniture Manufacturers' Federated Associations
 Jack Albert Billmeir. For political and public services.
 Henry John Bostock  For public services in Staffordshire.
 Herbert William Bowden  Labour Member of Parliament for South Leicester, 1945–50, and for South-West Leicester since 1950. Opposition Deputy Chief Whip since 1951. For political and public services.
 Alexander Doveton John Brennan, Deputy Chief Veterinary Officer, Ministry of Agriculture and Fisheries
 Major James Parry Brown  For political and public services in South Wales.
 John Norman Brown, Assistant Comptroller, Patent Office and Industrial Property Department, Board of Trade
 Ralph Waldo Cheseore, Deputy Chief Scientific Officer, Admiralty
 David Kenneth Clarke. For political services.
 Donovan Dennett Wilding Cole, Assistant Controller (Production), Atomic Energy Establishment, Risley, Ministry of Supply
 Brian Eliot Common, Chairman, Tyne Improvement Commission. Director, Common Brothers, Ltd.
 Roger Gresham Cooke, Director, The Society of Motor Manufacturers and Traders, Ltd.
 William Oliver Copeman  Chairman, Area Provisions and Grocery Committee for the Counties of Norfolk, Suffolk, Huntingdon, Isle of Ely and Bedford. For services during the recent floods in the Eastern Counties
 Robert Armstrong Corscadden, Chief Crown Solicitor, Northern Ireland
 John Cranna. For political services.
 Moss Dancyger  Assistant Secretary, Ministry of Pensions
 Clemence Dane (Miss Winifred Ashton), Author
 William Surrey Dane  Joint Managing Director, Odham's Press, Ltd. For services to King George's Jubilee Trust.
 Lieutenant-Colonel George Darby  Head of the Commercial Treaties Branch, Colonial Office
 Gwendolen Florence Davies  Assistant Private Secretary to the Prime Minister
 Thomas Morris Davies  Deputy Director General of Medical Services, Ministry of Pensions
 John Donovan, Member, Docks and Inland Waterways Executive
 Arthur Drewry  President of the Football League
 William Jolly Duncan, Mechan Professor of Aeronautics and Fluid Mechanics, University of Glasgow
 Harvey John Dunkerley, Controller, Midland Region, British Broadcasting Corporation
 Tom Eatough, Assistant Secretary, Export Credits Guarantee Department, Board of Trade
 Herbert Cecil Ralph Edwards, Keeper, Victoria and Albert Museum
 John Arthur Edwards, Deputy Chief Valuer, Board of Inland Revenue
 Willie Evans, Chairman and Managing Director of Chas. H. Challen and Son, Ltd.
 Edward Henry Everson, Command Secretary, Far East Land Forces, War Office
 Arthur Fage, Superintendent, Aerodynamics Division, National Physical Laboratory, Department of Scientific and Industrial Research
 George Daniel Frazer  Director of Savings, General Post Office
 Edward Granville Gordon Fost, Alderman, Cambridgeshire County Council
 Edwin Maxwell Fry, Architect and Town Planner
 Caroline Selina Ganley  Labour Co-operative Member of Parliament for Battersea South, 1945–51. President, London Co-operative Society, 1942–46. For political and public services.
 Hugh Gardner, Assistant Secretary, Ministry of Agriculture and Fisheries
 Walter Frank Gardner, President of the Institute of Actuaries. General Manager of the Prudential Assurance Company, Ltd.
 Neville Archibald Gass  a Managing Director, Anglo-Iranian Oil Company
 Harry Percy Gee  Chairman, Leicester Savings Committee
 Mary Spencer Revell, Lady Graham. For political and public services in the North West
 John Robert Griffin  General Secretary, British Legion
 Arthur Guilford, Director of Audit, Exchequer and Audit Department
 Alderman Grierson James Gully  Chairman, Kent River Board
 Gerald Francis Gurrin, Handwriting expert. For services to the Home Office
 Richard Lloyd Gwilt, President of the Faculty of Actuaries
 Kathleen Mary Halpin  Chief Administrator, Regional Department, Women's Voluntary Services
 John Norman Harmer, Assistant Secretary, Ministry of Labour and National Service
 Major Horace Reginald Haslett  Chairman, North Ireland War Pensions Committee
 John Hayward, Critic
 Harold Heady, Assistant Secretary, Ministry of Housing and Local Government
 Tom Hebron  Registrar and Chief Accountant, Westminster Abbey
 Evelyn Mary Hews, Alderman. For political and public services in Canterbury
 Jessie Emma Higson. For pioneer work in the field of Moral Welfare.
 Major Morton Hiles  Secretary-Treasurer, National Federation of Young Farmers' Clubs
 John Alexander Hillman, Assistant Commissioner of Crown Lands
 Edmund Albert Hogan, Registrar-General for Scotland
 Ernest James Henry Holt  lately Honorary Secretary, Treasurer, Amateur Athletic Federation
 George Frederick Thomas Hopkins  Superintendent, Royal Mews, Buckingham Palace
 Herbert Norman Howells, Composer
 John Francis Huntington, Assistant Secretary, Board of Inland Revenue
 James Edgar Hurst  President, British Cast Iron Research Association
 Ivor Benjamin Hugh James, Professor of Violoncello, Royal College of Music. For services to Chamber Music.
 Lieutenant-Colonel Frank Nevill Jennings  For political and public services in the Isle of Wight.
 Eric Alfred George Johnson, Chief Engineer, Ministry of Agriculture and Fisheries. For services during the recent floods in the Eastern Counties.
 Percy Marshall Johnson, Assistant Secretary, Ministry of Food
 Barry William Thomas Kay, Regional Controller, Midland Region, Board of Trade
 John Donald Kelly  For political and public services in Glasgow.
 Osbert Lancaster, Cartoonist
 Thomas Alan Lane, Director of Expense Accounts, Admiralty
 Francis Walsham Lawe, General Manager, Harrods, Ltd.
 Thomas Lawrie, General Manager, North of Scotland Hydro-Electric Board
 David Lean, Film Director
 Louis le Couteur, Deputy Chief Inspector of Factories, Ministry of Labour and National Service
 Colonel Bruce Hamer Leeson  Director of British Electrical and Allied Manufacturers Association, Inc
 William Leslie  For political and public services in Cornwall.
 Rhys Gerran Lloyd, Secretary, Royal Commission on Awards to Inventors
 Mervyn Lyster Longhurst, Assistant Legal Adviser, Ministry of Education
 Colonel John George Lowther  Lately Chairman, Territorial and Auxiliary Forces Association, Counties of Huntingdon and Northampton
 Harry Lyne  Area Secretary, YMCA. Southern Command
 Francis Charles McLean  Deputy Chief Engineer, British Broadcasting Corporation
 Lieutenant-Colonel Norman MacLeod  Member, National Executive Council of the British Legion, Scotland
 Eva Marion Maguire  Head Superintendent, Sandes Soldiers' and Airmen's Homes
 Keith Cranston Mann, Director of Works (Overseas), Air Ministry
 Carl Marshall  Assistant Secretary, National Assistance Board
 Archibald Daniel Marston  lately Dean of the Faculty of Anaesthetics, Royal College of Surgeons
 Arnold Ashley Miles  Director, Lister Institute of Preventive Medicine
 Horace William Minshull  Head of the Finance Department, Foreign Office
 John Methven Mitchell  Lately County Clerk of Fife
 Gilbert Richard Mitchison  Labour Member of Parliament for Kettering since 1945. For political and public services.
 Allan McLeod Mooney, Deputy Director of Electrical Engineering, Admiralty
 Sholto Douglas Morton, Regional Controller, East and West Ridings Region, Ministry of Labour and National Service
 Charles William Moss, Director, Vickers-Armstrongs, Ltd.
 Colonel Robert Fallows Mottershead. For political and public services in Blackburn.
 Edwin Muir, Author, Warden of Newbattle Abbey College, Midlothian
 Alfred Ross Murison  President, Educational Institute of Scotland
 The Reverend Valentine Paul Nevill, Headmaster, Ampleforth College, York
 Harry Porter Newman, Member of Council, National Association of Corn and Agricultural Merchants
 Henry Nimmo, Chairman, Southern Electricity Board
 Robert Noble, Regional Controller, East and West Ridings Region, Ministry of National Insurance
 Brigadier Harry Naismith Obbard, Chief Administrative Officer, India, Pakistan and South-East Asia District, Imperial War Graves Commission
 Donald Arthur Oliver, Metals Economy Adviser, Ministry of Supply
 John Nelson Panes, Government Secretary and Treasurer, Isle of Man
 Ernest George Peenman, Assistant Secretary, Ministry of Supply
 Nikolaus Bernard Leon Pevsner, Slade Professor of Fine Art, University of Cambridge
 Margaret Evelyn Popham, Principal, Cheltenham Ladies College
 Henry Charles Quincey  Commander, Metropolitan Police Force
 Marie Rambert (Mrs. Ashley Dukes), Founder and Directress of the Ballet Rambert
 Joseph Rawlinson, Chief Engineer, London County Council
 Douglas Norman Rayner, Director of Contracts, Ministry of Supply
 Frank RAayns  Director of the Norfolk Agricultural Station at Sprowston, Norwich
 Major John George Grey Rea  Chairman of the Northumberland Agricultural Executive Committee
 Colonel George Ewart Rhodes, Senior Engineering Inspector, Ministry of Housing and Local Government
 Emile Victor Rieu, Editor of the Penguin Classics
 Edward Charles Smith-Ross  Foreign Office
 James Eugene George Ruddin, President, National Federation of Cold Storage and Ice Trades
 Edward Lionel Russell, Chief Education Officer, Birmingham
 Arthur James Ryan, Regional Director, London Postal Region, General Post Office
 Robert Lindsay Scarlett  Chairman, Scottish Horticultural Advisory Committee
 Aileen Mona Scorrer, Chief Inspector, Children's Department, Home Office
 Lieutenant-Commander Peter Markham Scott  Director, Severn Wildfowl Trust
 William Goodwin Senior  Principal Dental Officer, Ministry of Health
 Harold Edward Sheardown, Chairman of Directors, Cook, Welton and Gemmell, Ltd.
 Albert Theodore Shepherd, Deputy Receiver, Metropolitan Police Office
 Reginald Harry Short  Clerk Comptroller of the Household of Her late Majesty Queen Mary
 Alastair Sim, Actor
 William Vernor Squire Sinclair, lately Assistant Procurator General
 William Thomas Charles Skyrme  Secretary of Commissions of the Peace, Lord Chancellor's Office
 Charles Stanley Smallman, Director of Accounts, Ministry of Civil Aviation
 Dorothy Madge Smith  Chairman, General Nursing Council for England and Wales, and Matron, Guy's Hospital
 William Henry Smith, Chairman, Welsh National Opera Company, Ltd.
 Reginald Bradbury Southall, Director and General Manager, National Oil Refineries, Ltd.
 Robert Southern, General Secretary, Co-operative Union, Ltd.
 Reginald Rowland Spears  lately Deputy Inspector-General, Royal Ulster Constabulary
 Robert Wilkie Stanton, Comptroller of Stamps and Taxes (Scotland), Board of Inland Revenue
 Freya Madeline Stark (Mrs. Stewart Perowne), Writer and Traveller
 Leslie Gordon Knowles Starke, Principal Actuary, Government Actuary's Department
 Alan Stewart  Head of Division, Ministry of National Insurance
 Gilbert Lines Strachan  For political and public services; and for services as Professor of Obstetrics and Gynaecology in the University of Wales.
 Joseph Summers  Chief Test Pilot, Vickers-Armstrongs, Ltd.
 Henry Richard Thomas, Chairman, Welsh Joint Education Committee
 Francis William Thompson, Librarian and Keeper of Collections, Chatsworth
 James Cyril Townsley. For political and public services in Kingston-upon-Hull.
 Matthew Charles Tozer, Assistant Secretary, Ministry of Fuel and Power
 Richard Robertson Trail  Medical Director, Papworth and Enham Alamein Village Settlements for the Tuberculous
 Joseph Tumin, Clerk of Assize, Oxford Circuit, Supreme Court of Judicature
 Captain Robert Ernest Tuearsley Tunbridge  (Retired), lately Master, s.s. "Chusan", Peninsular and Oriental Steam Navigation Company
 Cecil Francis Turner, Chairman and Managing Director, Stewart and Turner, Ltd. Chairman, the Antique Dealers Fair
 Lieutenant-Colonel Charles Arthur Carr Turner  Chief Executive, Crawley New Town Development Corporation
 Michael Theodore Waterhouse  Architect
 Michael Milne-Watson, Chairman, North Thames Gas Board
 Geoffrey Fairbank Webb, Secretary, Royal Commission on Historical Monuments (England)
 Denys Roger Hesketh Williams, Managing Director, John Taylors, Ltd., Huddersfield
 Douglas James Willson  Assistant Solicitor. Board of Customs and Excise
 Lieutenant-Colonel George Robert Stewart Wilson, Royal Engineers, (Retired), Chief Inspecting Officer of Railways, Ministry of Transport
 George Woodcock, Assistant General Secretary, Trades Union Congress
 Arthur Thomas Worboys  Chairman, London Brick Company, Ltd.
 Hubert Stanley Young  Deputy Chief Scientific Officer, Ministry of Defence
 Albert Spencer Calvert  Her Majesty's Consul-General at Tunis
 William John Castle, Deputy Economic and Financial Adviser, Control Commission for Germany (British Element)
 Sydney Ernest Henry Daw  Counsellor (Commercial) at Her Majesty's Embassy in Vienna
 Captain Christmas David Howell  Royal Navy (Retired), British Council Representative in Egypt
 Edward Thomas Lambert, Her Majesty's Consul-General at Geneva
 Henry Brockholst Livingston, lately Her Majesty's Envoy Extraordinary and Minister Plenipotentiary at San Jose
 Edwin Patrick Moxey, British subject resident in the Argentine Republic
 Thomas Richard Hornby Owen, Governor, Bahr-el-Ghazal Province, Sudan
 Stanhope Rowton Simpson, Registrar General and Commissioner of Lands, Sudan Government
 George Frederick Walpole, Director of Lands and Surveys under the Government of the Hashemite Kingdom of the Jordan
 Gilbert Brown  of the State of South Australia. For services in the development of Anaesthetics.
 Maxwell Gordon Butcher  For public services in the State of Tasmania.
 The Reverend Herbert Carter, General Superintendent of the Methodist Church of Southern Rhodesia
 Louis Samuel Glover  Member of the European Advisory Council, Bechuanaland Protectorate, and a former Chairman of the Council
 Bevis Royal Graham  President of the Associated Chambers of Commerce of Pakistan
 Major Ernest Sirdefield Harston  Honorary Secretary, British Empire Service League
 Air Vice-Marshal Malcolm Henderson  (Retired), Director-General of the Over-Seas League
 Richard Henry Maclure Lea, General Manager of the Electricity Trust, State of South Australia
 Albert Millin  Member of the European Advisory Council of Swaziland since 1921
 Charles Kingsley Murphy  Clerk of the House of Assembly, and Librarian to Parliament, State of Tasmania
 Ivan Herbert Pierce  a Member of the European Advisory Council of Swaziland since 1921
 Thomas John Rooney, Chairman of the Land and Agriculture Bank, Southern Rhodesia
 Robert Walker  a prominent tea planter in South India. For services to the United Kingdom community.
 John Philip Attenborough  Colonial Education Service, Director of Education, Tanganyika
 Andrew Gordon Beattie, lately Inspector-General of Agriculture, Nigeria
 Reginald Laing Brooks, Colonial Forest Service, Permanent Secretary to the Ministry of Agriculture and Natural Resources, Gold Coast
 George Cabral. For public services in Trinidad.
 Alan Taylor Howell  Colonial Medical Service, Director of Medical Services, Tanganyika
 Kenneth Charles Jacobs  Financial Secretary, Sierra Leone
 Percival Henry Jennings, Colonial Audit Service, Director of Audit, Hong Kong
 Rajabali Jumabhoy  For public services in Singapore.
 The Right Reverend Leonard Stanley Kempthorne, Bishop in Polynesia, Fiji
 Amar Nath Maini  For public services in Uganda.
 Andre Lawrence Nairac. For public services in Mauritius.
 Ralph Arthur Nicholson, Colonial Administrative Service, Economic Secretary, Northern Rhodesia
 George William Kelly Roberts. For public services in the Bahamas.
 Peter George Russo  For public services in Gibraltar.
 Philip Manderson Sherlock, Vice Principal and Director of Extra-Mural Studies, University College of the West Indies
 Alexander Skinner, Director of Marine, Nigeria
 Robert de Stapeldon Stapledon  Colonial Administrative Service, Economic Secretary, East Africa High Commission
 Nathaniel Henry Peniston Vesey. For public services in Bermuda.
 Douglas Tremayne Waring. For public services in the Federation of Malaya.
 Lionel Digby Whitfield, Colonial Education Service, Director of Education, Federation of Malaya

Honorary Commanders
 Dato Syed Abdul Kadir bin Mohamed bin Yahya, Mentri Besar, Johore, Federation of Malaya
 Vadake Menokil Narayana Menon  For public services in the Federation of Malaya.
 Mallam Ahmadu, Sardauna of Sokoto, Northern Regional Minister of Works, Nigeria

Officers (OBE)

Military Division 
 Lieutenant-Commander Charles Edward Stuart Basil St. George Beal, Royal Navy
 Lieutenant-Colonel Edward Ashley Brown, Royal Marines
 Commander (L) Albert Edward Chiverton, Royal Navy
 Commander (E) Peter Laurence Cloete, Royal Navy
 Lieutenant-Commander Godfrey Vincent Corbett, Royal Navy
 Commander Charles Edward Eckersley-Maslin, Royal Navy
 The Reverend Edward George Dalton Fawkes, Chaplain, Royal Navy
 Commander (E) John Noel Fisher Haigh, Royal Navy (Retired)
 Commander (E) Trevor Sydney Hayes  Royal Navy (Retired)
 Commander (S) Leonard Alphonso Jeffery, Royal Navy
 Instructor Commander Harold John Jessup, Royal Navy
 Lieutenant-Colonel Martin Price  Royal Marines
 Surgeon Commander John Mansel Reese  Royal Navy
 Commander George Frederick Rutter  (Retired), Captain R.F.A. Service
 Commander Patrick Astor Trier, Royal Navy (Retired)
 Commander (S) John Douglas Trythall, Royal Navy
 Lieutenant-Colonel (temporary) James Harry Allason, 3rd Carabiniers (Prince of Wales's Dragoon Guards), Royal Armoured Corps
 Major Alan Edward Bray  Royal Regiment of Artillery
 Lieutenant-Colonel (T.O.T.) Albert Henry Britton, Royal Corps of Signals
 Lieutenant-Colonel (temporary) Thomas Richard Broughton, The Royal Scots (The Royal Regiment)
 Major Ian Rupert Burrows  The Middlesex Regiment (Duke of Cambridge's Own)
 Lieutenant-Colonel (temporary) Cedric George Buttenshaw  Royal Regiment of Artillery
 Lieutenant-Colonel (now Colonel) Archibald Inglis Crawford  Royal Regiment of Artillery, Territorial Army
 Lieutenant-Colonel Gordon John Cruddas, The Royal Northumberland Fusiliers, Territorial Army (now T.A.R.O.)
 Brevet Lieutenant-Colonel Charles Julius Deedes  The King's Own Yorkshire Light Infantry
 Lieutenant-Colonel Francis Vernon Denton  The King's Regiment (Liverpool), Territorial Army
 Lieutenant-Colonel (temporary) Anthony Henry George Dobson  Corps of Royal Engineers
 Lieutenant-Colonel Cecil Bryan Gibbons, Corps of Royal Electrical and Mechanical Engineers
 Lieutenant-Colonel (temporary) Henry Pryce Gillespie, The South Wales Borderers
 Lieutenant-Colonel Charles Henry Pepys Harington  The Cheshire Regiment
 Lieutenant-Colonel Pierse Francis Hayes, Corps of Royal Engineers
 Lieutenant-Colonel Ronald Edwin Holden  Westminster Dragoons (2nd County of London Yeomanry), Royal Armoured Corps, Territorial Army
 Lieutenant-Colonel (Quartermaster) Walter George Holden, Employed List II (late Royal Army Service Corps)
 Lieutenant-Colonel Whitaker Austin Holmes  The East Yorkshire Regiment (The Duke of York's Own), Territorial Army
 Lieutenant-Colonel (temporary) David Leonard Powell-Jones  6th Gurkha Rifles
 Major (Quartermaster) James Notman Keil  The Seaforth Highlanders (Ross-shire Buffs, The Duke of Albany's)
 Lieutenant-Colonel (temporary) Herbert Alfred Temple Jarrett-Kerr, Corps of Royal Engineers
 The Reverend Canon John Robertson Hardie Knox, Chaplain to the Forces, Second Class (temporary), Royal Army Chaplains' Department
 Lieutenant-Colonel Samuel John Lamplugh, Employed List I (late Royal Regiment of Artillery)
 Lieutenant-Colonel (Director of Music) Albert Lemoine, The Life Guards
 Lieutenant-Colonel (temporary) Godfrey Lerwill  The Middlesex Regiment (Duke of Cambridge's Own)
 Lieutenant-Colonel (temporary) John Palmer Lloyd  Royal Regiment of Artillery (now T.A.R.O.)
 Brevet Lieutenant-Colonel Ronald Clarence Macdonald  The Royal Warwickshire Regiment
 Lieutenant-Colonel (temporary) Sir Edward William St. Lo Malet, Bt., 8th King's Royal Irish Hussars, Royal Armoured Corps
 Lieutenant-Colonel (O.E.O.) Gerald John Mitchell  Royal Army Ordnance Corps
 Brevet Lieutenant-Colonel Charles Harold Arthur Olivier, Royal Regiment of Artillery
 Lieutenant-Colonel John Reginald Henry Orr, Employed List I (late The Royal Welch Fusiliers)
 Lieutenant-Colonel Edgar Claude Manning Palmer  Royal Regiment of Artillery, Territorial Army (now T.A.R.O.)
 Lieutenant-Colonel Alastair Stevenson Pearson  The Parachute Regiment, Territorial Army
 Lieutenant-Colonel Charles William Provis  Royal Regiment of Artillery, Territorial Army
 Lieutenant-Colonel (temporary) Albert Harry Reading, Corps of Royal Engineers
 Lieutenant-Colonel Percy Fergus Ivo Reid, Irish Guards
 Lieutenant-Colonel (acting) Alexander Rennie, Army Cadet Force
 Lieutenant-Colonel Norman William Schenke, Corps of Royal Electrical and Mechanical Engineers
 Lieutenant-Colonel (local) Richard Christopher Sharples  Welsh Guards
 Lieutenant-Colonel (acting) John Cleave Simmons  Combined Cadet Force
 Brevet Lieutenant-Colonel William Alexander Stevenson  The Queen's Own Cameron Highlanders
 Lieutenant-Colonel Giles Symonds  The Dorset Regiment, Territorial Army
 Lieutenant-Colonel Arthur William Thompson  The Border Regiment, Territorial Army (now T.A.R.O.)
 Honorary Lieutenant-Colonel Leslie Nelson Turner  Combined Cadet Force (now retired)
 Lieutenant-Colonel Leslie James Walker 
 Lieutenant-Colonel (temporary) Noel Montague Harold Wall  7th Queen's Own Hussars, Royal Armoured Corps
 Lieutenant-Colonel Henry de Grey Warter  Royal Regiment of Artillery, Territorial Army
 Lieutenant-Colonel Alfred Hubert Graham Wathen, The Duke of Wellington's Regiment (West Riding)
 Lieutenant-Colonel (temporary) George Witheridge  Royal Tank Regiment, Royal Armoured Corps
 Lieutenant-Colonel (temporary) Desmond Patrick O'Brien, Corps of Royal Engineers, at present on loan to the Government of India
 Lieutenant-Colonel George Edward Litchfield Rule, Rhodesian African Rifles, Southern Rhodesia Military Forces
 Major David Burnett  The South Lancashire Regiment (The Prince of Wales's Volunteers), attached The Malay Regiment
 Lieutenant-Colonel Alexander Thomson Edgar  Federation of Malaya Volunteer Force
 Colonel Edward Ward Seymour Jacklin  Southern Rhodesia Air Force
 Acting Group Captain Ronald Alan Campbell Barclay  Royal Air Force
 The Reverend Gerald William Norris Groves, Royal Air Force
 Wing Commander Ronald Clarke Cobbe  Royal Air Force
 Wing Commander Albert Edward Davies, Royal Air Force
 Wing Commander Gordon Hugh Everitt  Royal Air Force
 Wing Commander Robert Thomas Frogley  Royal Air Force
 Wing Commander James Edward Holliwell  Royal Air Force
 Wing Commander Edward Arthur Jackson, Royal Air Force
 Wing Commander David Richard Spencer Bevan-John, Royal Air Force
 Wing Commander Norman Alfred Martin, Royal Air Force Regiment
 Wing Commander William Gordon Oldbury  Royal Air Force
 Wing Commander Alan Richardson, Royal Air Force
 Wing Commander Denis Dart Rogers, Royal Air Force
 Wing Commander Walter Smith, Royal Air Force
 Wing Commander Gerald Tate  Royal Air Force
 Wing Commander Charles Douglas Tomalin  Royal Air Force
 Acting Wing Commander Maurice Swainston Anthony, Royal Auxiliary Air Force
 Squadron Leader Ian Robert Blair, Royal Air Force
 Squadron Leader George Dennithorne Castle, Royal Air Force
 Squadron Leader Frederick Ellison  Royal Air Force
 Squadron Leader Joseph Edward Lewis, Royal Air Force
 Squadron Leader Leslie Arthur Popham, Royal Air Force
 Squadron Leader Arthur Weaver, Royal Air Force
 Acting Squadron Leader Eric Robinson, Royal Air Force
 Rab Khaila Zaia Gewergis  Royal Air Force Levies, Iraq

Civil Division 
 Frederick William Abraham, Motive Power Superintendent (London Midland Region), Railway Executive
 Captain Marmaduke Johnathan Roland Alderson, Fleet Manager, Comets. British Overseas Airways Corporation
 Thomas Allsop , Chairman, Derbyshire Executive Council, National Health Service
 Frederick Victor Ames, Principal, Board of Trade
 Alexander Anderson, Chairman, Wishaw and District Employment Committee
 George Rowland Armstrong, Chief Engineer, M.V. Esso Bedford, Esso Transportation Company, Ltd.
 Sydney George Bailey , Secretary, Cake and Biscuit Alliance, Ltd.
 John Gibb Ballingall, Principal Scientific Officer, Torpedo Experimental Establishment, Greenock
 Andrew Lindsay Barclay , Deputy Controller of Supplies, Ministry of Works
 Brian Basil Philip Barker, Chief Information Officer, Ministry of Works
 John Barker, Member of the Council of the National Farmers' Union
 Joanna Cecilia Barnard, Regional Administrator, South Eastern Region, Women's Voluntary Services
 Albert Edward Barton, Principal Accountant, Mersey Docks and Harbour Board
 Harold Thomas William Bateman, Waterguard Superintendent, Glasgow, Board of Customs and Excise
 Charles Henry Bates, Grade 2 Officer, North Midlands Region, Ministry of Labour and National Service
 Wing Commander Roland Prosper Beamont , Chief Test Pilot, English Electric Company, Ltd.
 Edward Benjamin Bein, Chief Executive Officer, Ministry of National Insurance
 Alfred Charles Best, Principal Scientific Officer, Meteorological Office, Air Ministry
 Harold Hoghton Best , Principal, War Office
 Robert Beveridge, Chief Examiner, Estate Duty Office (Scotland), Board of Inland Revenue
 Charles Wright Blasdale, Senior Inspector of Taxes, Board of Inland Revenue
 James Alexander Vazeille Boddy , Chairman, Midland Area Council, British Legion
 Fred Booth, Chairman and Managing Director, The Heckmondwike Flock Company, Ltd., Batley, Yorkshire
 William Thomas Boston, Swordbearer, Corporation of London
 Charles Anthony Boucher , Medical Officer, Ministry of Health
 Andrew John Bowron, Managing Director, F.N.F., Ltd. Textile Engineers, Burton-on-Trent
 Stanley Herbert Bright, Chief Executive Officer, Admiralty
 Alderman Richard Browell , Vice-Chairman, Newburn Urban District Council
 Colonel Alexander Denis Burnett-Brown , Secretary, Royal National Lifeboat Institution
 Alfred Willoughby Hope Brown, Deputy Chief Inspector (Planning), Ministry of Housing and Local Government
 George Chadwin Brown , Chief Executive Officer, Ministry of Defence
 William Brown  Chairman, Huntingdonshire County Council
 William Brown, Chairman, Wigan, Chorley and District War Pensions Committee
 Harry James Browning, Deputy Chief Investigation Officer, Board of Customs and Excise
 Robert Bruce, County Agricultural Officer, Ministry of Agriculture and Fisheries
 William Buckie, Technical Manager, Swan, Hunter and Wigham Richardson, Ltd., Wallsend-on-Tyne
 John Gilby Bullen, General Manager, Highland Reduction Works, British Aluminium Company, Ltd.
 Lieutenant-Colonel Frederick David Harold Burcher. For political and public services in Kidderminster.
 Charles Frederick Burden, Deputy Director, Aeronautical Inspection Services, Air Ministry
 Harry Burdge , For political and public services in Belfast.
 Donald Henry Burgess Deputy Trade Director, Ministry of Food
 Arthur Ulick Burke. For public services in Belfast.
 Major Cecil Burnham , lately Commandant, Star and Garter Home for Disabled Soldiers, Sailors and Airmen, Richmond
 Eleanor Mary Beresford Butler , Vice-Chairman, Oxford Savings Committee
 William John Hughes Butterfield , Member of the Scientific Staff, Medical Research Council
 The Reverend Lewis Legertwood Legg Cameron , Director, Church of Scotland Committee on Social Service
 Charles Stewart Campbell, Director of Sulphur and Sulphuric Acid Supplies, Ministry of Materials
 Sidney Ronald Campion, Principal Information Officer, General Post Office
 Harold James Cartwright, Principal Accountant, Ministry of Works
 Eleanor Rosalie Lancashire Cave. For political and public services in Bristol.
 Charles Chambers. Chief Engineer, Fighter Command, Royal Air Force
 Walter William Chapman , Architect, Ministry of Education
 Richard Chatterton, Chief Executive Officer, Home Office
 Philip Boughton Chatwin, Archaeologist. For services to the Ministry of Works.
 John Clancy, Managing Director, J.C. Hotels, Ltd.
 Alexander Morton Clark, Chairman, Scottish Accident Prevention Council
 Andrew Lewis Cochrane, Chairman and Managing Director. Cochrane and Sons, Ltd., Selby
 George Frederick Congdon, Town Clerk, Harwich. For services during the recent floods in the Eastern Counties.
 Reginald Thomas Cook, Principal Inspector, Board of Customs and Excise
 Leslie Charles Coombes , Constructor, H.M. Dockyard, Chatham. For services during the recent floods in the Eastern Counties.
 Lieutenant-Colonel John Morton Vernon Cotterell, Secretary, Territorial and Auxiliary Forces Association, County of Chester
 Alfred Henry Coulter , For political services in Northern Ireland
 Robert Cousland, Shipbuilding Manager, J. Samuel White and Company, Ltd., Cowes
 Herbert Maurice Cowell, Assistant Regional Controller, Eastern Region, Ministry of National Insurance
 Thomas Alfred Methuen Croucher, Principal, Ministry of Agriculture and Fisheries. For services during the recent floods in the Eastern Counties.
 Hugh John Curnow, Assistant Director, Aircraft Production Supplies (Materials), Ministry of Supply
 Katharine Hannay Barrs Da Vies. Independent Member of Wages Councils
 William Robert Davies , Secretary of the Liberal Party Organisation. For political services.
 John Edward Davis, Chief Technical Officer, South Eastern Gas Board
 Charles Vivian Dawe, Principal Agricultural Economist, University of Bristol
 Seymour Joly De Lotbiniere, Head of Television Outside Broadcasting, British; Broadcasting Corporation
 Daniel Joseph Devlin, Senior Inspector of Taxes, Board of Inland Revenue
 Frank Dickinson. For political and public services in Yorkshire.
 Henry Dinsmore , Director of Education, County Down
 Ernest Harvey Doubleday, County Planning Officer, Hertfordshire County Council
 Irene Dowling. For political and public services in London.
 William Henry Nassau Downer, General Secretary, Council for the Encouragement of Music and the Arts (Northern Ireland)
 Frederick Doy, Principal, Board of Trade
 Harry Earnshaw, General Secretary, Amalgamated Association of Beamers, Twisters and Drawers
 Richard Victor Eaton, Superintendent, Royal Naval Propellant Factory, Caerwent, Monmouthshire
 John Charles Newport Eppstein, Director, British Society For International Understanding
 Ida Mary Eugster , Regional Administrator, Eastern Region, Women's Voluntary Services
 Raymond Ogier Falla, President States of Guernsey Committee for Horticulture
 Darrell Fancourt (Darrell Louis Fancourt Leverson), Opera singer, D'Oyly Carte Opera Company
 Donald Gordon Farrow, Chief Education Officer, Great Yarmouth. For services during the recent floods in the Eastern Counties.
 Frank Charles Fenton, Chief Commercial Officer, London Electricity Board
 William Ferguson , For political services in North Down.
 Horace Philip Finch, Aerodrome Commandant, Grade I. Ministry of Civil Aviation
 Ernest Fleming, lately Chief Executive Officer, Agricultural Research Council
 Percy Howard Ford, lately Works Manager, Guest, Keen and Nettlefolds, Ltd., Birmingham
 Norman William Frederick Fowler, Assistant Chief Constable, Kent County Constabulary. For services during the recent floods in the Eastern Counties.
 Richard Henry French , Assistant to the Master in Lunacy, Supreme Court of Judicature
 Albert James Galpest , Assistant Secretary, Lord Chamberlain's Office
 Herbert Washington Gamble, lately President of the Pharmaceutical Society of Northern Ireland
 Frederick Augustus Gear, Assistant Director, Technical and Personnel Administration, Ministry of Supply
 Jane Dorothy Ross Gibson, Matron, Newcastle upon Tyne General Hospital
 Captain Frank Newman Gilbey. For services to the Master of the Horse
 Charles Wilfrid Scorr-Giles, Secretary, Institution of Municipal Engineers
 Mary Gaskell Gillick, Sculptor and Medal Artist
 Ernest Edward Gingell, Principal Collector of Taxes, Board of Inland Revenue
 John Charles Glover, Deputy Director, Oils and Fats Division, Ministry of Food
 Cyril James Goad. Chief Officer, Gloucestershire Fire Brigade
 John Fletcher Go Am An, Senior Marketing Officer, Ministry of Agriculture and Fisheries
 Strathearn Gordon, Librarian, House of Commons
 James Thompson Graham, Employer Vice-Chairman, North Midland Regional Board for Industry
 Kenneth John Grant , Medical Officer of Health, Great Yarmouth. For services during the recent floods in the Eastern Counties.
 Thomas Forgie Gray, Secretary, Bradford Chamber of Commerce
 William Ewart Greenhalgh, Chief Officer, Coventry Fire Brigade.
 Lieutenant-Colonel Ronald Berry Greenwood, Assistant Chief Constable, Lincolnshire County Constabulary. For services during the recent floods in the Eastern Counties.
 Sydney Gordon Griffin, Principal, Ministry of Transport
 Captain Hugh Peary Griffiths, Assistant Commissioner, City of London Police Force
 Francis Walter Grimes, Grade 2 Officer, Midlands Region, Ministry of Labour and National Service
 Harold Charlesworth Grimshaw, Principal Scientific Officer, Safety in Mines Research Establishment, Ministry of Fuel and Power
 William Herbert Grinsted , Chief Engineer, Siemens Brothers and Company, Ltd., Woolwich
 Cecil Brodrick Guthrie. For services to the Home Office.
 Major Eben Stuart Burt Hamilton , Commissioner, Duke of Lancaster's District, St. John Ambulance Brigade
 Isa Hamilton, lately Superintendent, Queen's Institute of District Nursing
 John Ireland Hamilton, Principal Officer, Ministry of Labour and National Insurance, Northern Ireland
 Henry Frank Hancock, Assistant Shipping Attache, H.M. Embassy in Washington
 Kathleen Irene Hancock, Personal Private Secretary to the Minister of Fuel and Power
 Louis Arthur Hanuy, Assistant Regional Controller, South Western Region, Ministry of National Insurance
 Honoria Eugenie Harford, lately General Secretary, National Association of Girls' Clubs and Mixed Clubs
 Frederick Louis Harris , Extramural Tutor, University College of the South-West
 Natalie Muriel Harris, Foreign Office
 James More Wood Harvey, Deputy City Commandant, Ulster Special Constabulary, Londonderry
 Robert William Harvey, Clerk to the Felixstowe Urban District Council. For services during the recent floods in the Eastern Counties.
 George Horace Hatherill , Deputy Commander, Metropolitan Police Force
 Edwin Haward, lately Secretary, the India, Pakistan and Burma Association
 John Ganly Heaslip, Senior Engineer, South Eastern Divisional Road Engineer's Office, Ministry of Transport
 Cedric Hedderwick, Managing Director, Somerset Accredited Breeders Hatchery, Ltd.
 William Heron, Staff Inspector for Further Education, Ministry of Education, Northern Ireland
 James Herbert Hewitt, Principal, Ministry of Labour and National Service
 Anthony Ewart Ledger Hill, Chairman, Hampshire And Isle of Wight Association of Boys' Clubs
 John Hill, Procurator Fiscal of Renfrewshire, Paisley
 Edwin Russell Hooper, Assistant Secretary, Metropolitan Police Office
 George Henry Augustus Hughes, Director, London Master Builders' Association
 Frederick Arthur Hunt, Chief Executive Officer, Board of Trade
 James Hyman, Principal, H.M. Treasury
 Daniel Durnford Ivall, Assistant Chief Officer, Middlesex Fire Brigade
 William Hart MacIndoe Jackson, Employers' Secretary, National Joint Industrial Council for the Electric Cable Slaking Industry
 Robert Ian Johnson, Director of Canning, Ministry of Food
 John Lees-Jones , Chairman, National Association of Discharged Prisoners Aid Societies
 Joseph Jones, Labour Director, West Midlands Division, National Coal Board
 Kenneth Latimer Jones, Chairman, Luton Savings Council
 Phyllis Eveline Jones, Personal Assistant to the Secretary of the Parliamentary Labour Party. For political services.
 Major Thomas Ifpr Jones , For political and public services in Wales.
 Frederick Joseph Kemp, Honorary Secretary, Association of Collecting Friendly Societies
 The Right Honourable Edith, Viscountess Kemsley, Chairman, Mauritius Bureau
 Wilfred Kershaw, Honorary Secretary of the Textile Institute
 Evelyn Mary Killby. For political services.
 Stanley Edwin King, Chief Executive Officer, Board of Trade
 Harold James Kotch, County Welfare Officer, Warwickshire
 John Privett Langston, Director, Films Division, Central Office of Information
 Frank Harold Lawrence , Mayor of Chatham
 Lieutenant-Colonel Reginald Ledingham , For political services.
 Walter Kelly Wallace Lees, Headmaster, Thornly Park Approved School, Paisley
 Philip Le Feuvre, Senator of the States of Jersey
 Cynthia Combermere Legh , For political and public services in Cheshire.
 Thomas James Lester, Chief Executive Officer, Office of the Commissioners of Crown Lands
 Arthur Denis Carrington Le Sueur, Forestry Consultant
 The Reverend Isaac Levy, Senior Jewish Chaplain to H.M. Forces
 Alderman John Henry Lewis , For services to the Ministry of Fuel and Power.
 Richard Vincent Lewis, Clerk to the Mablethorpe and Sutton Urban District Council. For services during the recent floods in the Eastern Counties.
 Alexander Logan, Technical Manager, Marine Administration, Anglo-Saxon Petroleum Company, Ltd.
 Janet Isabella Low. For political and public services in Fife.
 Geoffrey Charles Lowry , Clerk to the Governors, Imperial College of Science and Technology, University of London
 Anne Hutcheson McAllister, Principal Lecturer, Jordanhill Training College, Glasgow
 James Sanderson McGregor , Medical Superintendent, Saxondale (Mental) Hospital, Radcliffe-on-Trent, Nottinghamshire
 Enid Devoge McLeod , Deputy Controller, European Division, British Council
 James Carnegie McPetrie, Assistant Legal Adviser, Colonial Office
 George Menzie McTurk , Chairman, Ayrshire Joint Probation Committee
 Philip Vibert Mauger , Chairman, Richmond Local Employment Committee
 Clifford Edmund Mee, Assistant Chief Architect, Ministry of Works
 George Herbert Mysl Miles, Chairman of the Executive Committee. Association of British Aero Clubs and Centres
 Alan Gordon Mitchell, Commandant, Edinburgh Foot Special Constabulary
 Anstace Helen Moore , Headmistress, Faringdon County Grammar School for Girls, Berkshire
 Howard Stanley Morrison, Deputy Principal Executive Officer, War Office
 Robert Howell Murphy, Employers' Representative, National Arbitration Tribunal (Northern Ireland)
 Lieutenant-Colonel Clive Needell , Assistant Secretary (Investments), Church Commissioners
 John Cuthbert Needham, Chairman, Evershed and Vignoles, Ltd., London
 James Lawrie Neill, Grade 2 Officer, Nottingham, Ministry of Labour and National Service
 Alfred Edward Nelson, Chief Engineer, S.S. Kenya, British India Steam Navigation Company, Ltd.
 Harold Aubrey Parker, Principal, Board of Customs and Excise
 John Abel Parkes , For public services in Staffordshire.
 Edward Lewis Ellman Pawley, Head of Engineering Services Group, British Broadcasting Corporation
 Douglas Henry Peacock, Member, Manchester Savings Committee
 Stuart Philip Pepin. For public services in Jersey.
 Leonard Lawrence Alfred Wheatley-Perry, Senior District Manager, Navy, Army and Air Force Institutes, Malaya
 Lieutenant-Colonel John Cecil Petherick . For political and public services in Kent.
 Major Francis Ashley Phillips , lately Clerk to the Wye Board of Conservators
 William Roy Piggott, Principal Scientific Officer, Radio Research Station, Department of Scientific and Industrial Research
 Hubert Percival Lancaster Pitman , Chairman, Northern London War Pensions Committee
 John Pollock, Chief Executive Officer, Ministry of Pensions
 Harry Royston Portman , Principal, Foreign Office
 Horace Clifford Potter, Principal, H.M. Treasury
 Henry Ray Powell , Secretary, Capital Issues Committee
 Christopher Jonathan Pridmore, Administration Officer, Maintenance Command, Royal Air Force
 Captain James Harrison Quick, Principal Examiner of Masters and Mates, Mercantile Marine, Ministry of Transport
 Gordon George Ramsay, Sheriff Clerk of Lanarkshire
 George Rankine , General Practitioner, Dundee
 Alfred William Rathbone , Assistant Controller, Supplies Department, General Post Office
 Captain Percy Reay , Chairman, Lyme Green Settlement for Paraplegics, Macclesfield
 David Morgan Rees , Member, Welsh Agricultural Land Sub-Commission
 Robert Charles Reginald Richards, Chief Executive Officer, Welsh Board of Health
 Captain Arthur Victor Richardson, lately Master, S.S. Gothic, Shaw Savill and Albion Company, Ltd.
 The Right Honourable Ursula, Viscountess Ridley. For public services in Northumberland.
 Archibald Colin Campbell Robertson , General Secretary, Oldham Provincial Card Blowing and Ringframe Operatives Association
 Charles Robins, Member, Central Management Committee, National Association of United Kingdom Oil and Oilseed Brokers, Ltd.
 John Arthur Rodwell, Chairman, Durham and Chester-le-Street Local Employment Committee
 Alfred Denys Strickland Rogers , For political and public services in Newcastle upon Tyne.
 Philip Docwra Rogers, lately Deputy Assistant Secretary and Clerk to the Council of the Royal Society
 John Rose, Senior Lands Officer, Department of Agriculture for Scotland
 Archibald Hugh Houstoun Ross, Conservator, Forestry Commission
 Dudley Spencer Reeve Ryder, Principal, Admiralty
 Rita Nimmo Sabey. For political and public services in Huntingdonshire.
 Frederick Claude Savage, First Secretary at H.M. Embassy in Dublin
 Bertram Cyril Scott, Chief Executive Officer, Ministry of Pensions, Ministry of Pensions Representative in Australia and New Zealand
 John Thomas Scoulding, Member, Appellate Tribunal under the National Service Acts
 George William Shummacher, Principal Officer, Ministry of Finance, Northern Ireland
 John Simpson, Deputy Secretary to the Commissioners of Northern Lighthouses
 Robert James Simpson, Chief Executive Officer, Civil Service Commission
 Geoffrey Roy Sisson, Head of Department of Mathematics, Royal Military Academy, Sandhurst
 Nelson Sizer , Assistant Chief Engineer, Ministry of Works
 Thomas Small, Plant Pathologist to the States of Jersey
 Harold James Smith, Grade 2 Officer, London and South Eastern Region, Ministry of Labour and National Service
 Captain John Joseph Smith, Commodore Captain, Elder Dempster Lines, Ltd.
 Louis Victor Smith , For political and public services in Berkshire.
 William Smith  Chief Officer, Stoke-on-Trent Fire Brigade
 Robert Henry Smyth, Principal, Ministry of Food
 Edward Lionel Snell, Chief Engineer, Essex River Board. For services during the recent floods in the Eastern Counties.
 Edward Leslie Spencer , Civil Assistant, War Office
 Claude Meyer Spielman , Managing Director, Whessoe, Ltd., Darlington
 Constance Spry, Adviser on Floral Decoration
 Leonard Jacques Stein. For political and public services.
 Harold Stevens , Vice-Chairman, Sunderland Savings Committee
 Arthur Gavin Stewart, lately Town Clerk of Motherwell and Wishaw
 Quintin Andrew Stewart, Divisional Veterinary Officer, Ministry of Agriculture and Fisheries
 Cecil Stonelake. For public services in Guernsey.
 Thomas Leonard Sturges, Staff Controller, South West Region, General Post Office
 William Sutherland, Area Secretary, British Legion, Northern Ireland
 John Edward Swain , Chairman, Peterborough Local Employment Committee
 The Right Honourable Gladys Helen Rachel, Dowager Baroness Swaythling, President of the Electrical Association for Women
 William Charles Swift, Assistant Director, Engineering, Ministry of Supply
 Frederick Joseph Talbot, Deputy Principal Regional Officer, Leeds, Ministry of Housing and Local Government
 Alderman Edward Taylor , Chairman, Bath Savings Committee
 Matthew Templeton. For services to sheep breeding.
 Commander Edward Terrell, late R.N.V.R. Chairman, General Committee of the Chevrons Club
 Cecil Thomas, Sculptor and Medal Artist
 Basil Duncan Tims , Principal, Commonwealth Relations Office
 Albert Ernest Tombs , Alderman, Borough of Abingdon, Berkshire
 Francis Henry Tomes, Chief Engineer, Lincolnshire River Board. For services during the recent floods in the Eastern Counties.
 Ernest William James Towler, H.M. Inspector of Schools, Ministry of Education
 Clement John Tranter, Associate Professor of Mathematics, Royal Military College of Science, War Office
 Ernest Trillwood, Lately Secretary, Jewellery and Silverware Council
 Philip John Owen Trist, County Agricultural Officer, East Suffolk. For services during the recent floods in the Eastern Counties.
 Harold Walker. For political and public services in Somerset.
 Ulric Bertram Walmsley , Chairman, Chelsea Savings Committee
 Bartholomew Walsh. For political and public services.
 Harry Ward , Head of Treaty and Nationality Department, Foreign Office
 Harold Joseph Hughes Wassell, Chief Radar Development Engineer, Marconi's Wireless Telegraph Company, Ltd.
 Oscar Samuel Watkinson, Clerk to the Hunstanton Urban District Council. For services during the recent floods in the Eastern Counties.
 Nita Grace Mary Watts, Economic Adviser, Cabinet Office
 Eileen Alexandra Waugh, lately Commissioner, Irish Division, Girls' Life Brigade
 Lieutenant-Commander Arthur Geoffrey Gascoyne Webb, Royal Navy (Retired), Deputy Secretary and Appeals Secretary, King George's Fund for Sailors
 Arthur Leslie Alabaster West, Treasurer, North-West Metropolitan Regional Hospital Board
 William West, Staff Engineer, Research Station, General Post Office
 Elizabeth Mary Western , County Organiser, Essex, Women's Voluntary Services. For services during the recent floods in the Eastern Counties.
 John Duncan White , Director, Radiodiagnostic Department, Hammersmith Hospital
 Alan Paul Francis Whitworth, Director, Incorporated Society of British Advertisers, Ltd.
 John Henry Wigglesworth, General Secretary, Iron, Steel and Metal Dressers' Trade Society
 Charles Timothy Wilkins, Assistant Chief Designer, De Havilland Aircraft Company, Ltd.
 Major Thomas Macfarlane Wilks , Area Commissioner, St. John Ambulance Brigade, London. For services during the recent floods in the Eastern Counties.
 Alderman Daniel Thomas Williams , For political and public services in Cardiff.
 William Sidney Gwynn Williams. For services to the International Eisteddfod at Llangollen
 Lieutenant-Colonel Clifford Llewellyn Wilson , County Director, Essex, British Red Cross Society. For services during the recent floods in the Eastern Counties.
 The Right Honourable Ivor Grosvenor, Viscount Wimborne. For political and public services.
 Thomas Arnold Woodcock , Headmaster, Ashby-de-la-Zouch Grammar School for Boys
 James Arthur Woodford , Sculptor
 Constance Muriel Wyatt, Director, Civilian Welfare Department, British Red Cross Society

Diplomatic Service and Overseas List
 Aaron Abensur, British subject resident in Tangier
 Hubert Thomas Booker, British subject resident in Peru
 The Right Reverend George Alexander Chambers, Chaplain at Her Majesty's Embassy in Paris
 William Thomas Clark, Commissioner, Port Sudan
 Frederick Barber Denham, Acting General Manager in Israel of the Ottoman Bank
 Leonard Henry Dismore, lately Her Majesty's Consul at Medan
 Rudolph Philip Elwes  Senior Control Officer, Dortmund, Control Commission for Germany (British Element)
 Leonard Arthur Frenken  Attached to the United Kingdom Trade Commissioner, Singapore
 Professor Edward Vivian Gatenby, Linguistics Adviser to the British Council in Turkey
 Iain Archibald Gillespie, Senior Veterinary Inspector, Sudan Government
 Conrad Frederick Heron, lately First Secretary (Labour) at Her Majesty's Embassy in Brussels
 John Wynn Kenrick, District Commissioner, Omdurman, Sudan
 Emile Philip Lecours, First Secretary (Information) at Her Majesty's Embassy in Mexico City
 Colonel William Joseph Moody  lately Medical Adviser to the British Political Resident and Chief Quarantine Medical Officer, Persian Gulf
 John Massey Morris  Chief Electrical and Mechanical Engineer, Basra Port
 Charles Joseph Plumb, Principal, lately Control Commission for Germany (British Element)
 Henry Richards  Assistant Director (Public Health), Sudan Government
 Edward John Roberts, Senior Public Safety Officer, Carinthia, Austria.
 Ina Amelia Strong  Her Majesty's Consul at Bergen
 Emrys Cadwaladr Thomas  Director of the Victoria Hospital, Damascus
 Allan Veitch  Her Majesty's Consul at Shanghai
 John Thorp Whittaker, Temporary Chief Executive Officer, Control Commission for Germany (British Element)

Colonies, Protectorates, etc
 Ann Frances Ellen Adams, Matron, Lachlan Park Mental Hospital, State of Tasmania
 Thomas Malcolm Arthur, Chairman of the Pakistan Tea Association, 1952–53
 John Henry Belderson, Principal Auditor, Basutoland, the Bechuanaland Protectorate and Swaziland
 John Bishop, Elder Professor of Music 'at the University of Adelaide, State of South Australia
 Ferdinand Hugo Bosman, Director of Agriculture, Bechuanaland Protectorate
 Edgar Esteban Cockram, Vice-Chairman of the Bombay Branch of the United Kingdom Citizens' Association in India
 Mary Cumming. For services rendered under the auspices of the Victoria League in connection with hospitality to visitors from overseas
 Mary Stuart Douglas, President of the Ex-Servicewomen's Association, and State Commissioner for Girl Guides, State of South Australia
 William Llewellyn Garratt, Secretary for Mines and Transport, Southern Rhodesia
 Gladys Ruth Gibson, Inspector, Education Department, and President of the National Council of Women, State of South Australia
 Alfred Arthur Haylbs, Editor of The Mail, Madras. For services to the United Kingdom community in South India.
 John George Maydon King  Director of Livestock and Agricultural Services, Basutoland
 Sydney Vernon Lawrenson, Administrative Officer, Staff Grade, Bechuanaland Protectorate
 Henry Gerald Livingston, Secretary of the Beit Trust in Southern Rhodesia
 Alan Campbell Mckay, Chairman of the Exchange Banks Association in Karachi. For services to the United Kingdom community in West Pakistan.
 William Charles Morris, formerly Headmaster of the Launceston High School, State of Tasmania
 Major Cecil John Somerset Paddon, Honorary Secretary and President, Society of the 1893 Column, Southern Rhodesia. For social welfare services, particularly to the pioneers and their families.
 Eric Drew Palmer, Chairman of the Food Production Committee, Southern Rhodesia
 Rex Whaddon Parsons, Principal, School of Mines and Industries, State of South Australia
 Sarah Anderson Jamieson Rankine  Medical Officer in charge of St. Margaret's Hospital, Poona, Bombay
 Victor Lloyd Robinson, Attorney General, Southern Rhodesia
 The Reverend Canon James Russel Robson, Priest-in-Charge of St. Paul's School Mission, Scott's Lane, Sealdah, Calcutta, India
 George Robertson Ross  Member of the Public Services Board, Southern Rhodesia
 William Wilson  Council Clerk of the Lilydale Municipality, and formerly Secretary of the Municipal Association, State of Tasmania

Colonial Service
 Robert Patrick Baffour. For public and social services in the Gold Coast.
 William Muir Bissell, Commissioner of Labour, British Guiana
 Frank Stanley Blomfield, Deputy Chief Clerk and Deputy Establishment Officer, Office of the Crown Agents for the Colonies
 Edward Justin Borron, Assistant General Manager, Nyasaland Railways
 Herbert Colling Wood Algernon Bryant, Colonial Administrative Service, Administrative Officer, Western Pacific
 Ratu George Cakobau, Fijian Chief, Fiji
 Channes Gavril Chakarian. For public services in Cyprus.
 Leonard Jan Bruce-Chwatt, Senior Malariologist, Nigeria
 Ena Phyllis Clark, Colonial Education Service, Assistant Director of Education (Women and Girls), Gold Coast
 Richard Alexander Seymour Cory  Colonial Medical Service, Senior Medical Officer, Tuberculosis Sanitorium, Jamaica
 Lionel Cresson. For public services in Singapore.
 Maurice Herbert Davis. For public services in St. Kitts, Leeward Islands.
 Anthony Falzon, Manager, Water and Electricity Department, Malta
 Maurice William Ghersie, Director of Produce Disposal, East African Production and Supply Council
 Richard Whalley Gill, Colonial Administrative Service, District Officer, Uganda
 Geoffrey Leicester Gray, Colonial Administrative Service, Deputy Chief Secretary, North Borneo
 Robert William Green. For services to sport in Aden.
 Albert Joseph Hawe  Colonial Medical Service, Senior Specialist, Gold Coast
 Ernest Cranfield Hicks, Colonial Education Service, Senior Inspector of Schools, Perak, Federation of Malaya
 Sidney Walter Hockey, Director, The Eastern Caribbean Library Service, British Council, Trinidad
 Patrick Hamilton Hutchison, Custodian of Enemy Property, Tanganyika
 Effion Jones, Colonial Engineering Service, Senior Executive Engineer, Nigeria
 Thomas George Clayton Vaughan-Jones, Director of Game and Tsetse, Control, Northern Rhodesia
 Arthur Harry Kneller, Deputy Labour Commissioner, Kenya
 Gordon King  Professor of Obstetrics and Gynaecology, University of Hong Kong
 Kwok Chan  For public and social services in Hong Kong.
 Alistair James Mcintosh, Political Officer, Western Aden Protectorate
 Gabriel Martial. For public services in Mauritius.
 Alexander Mercer, Head of Posts and Telegraphs Department and Member of Executive Council, Falkland Islands
 William Morrissey Milliken, Colonial Administrative Service, Senior District Officer, Nigeria
 Charles Frederick Mummery, Chief Dental Officer, Federation of Malaya.
 George Edward Noel Oehlers. For services to Local Government in Singapore
 Dudley Murray O'Neale, Colonial Engineering Service, Deputy Director of Works and Hydraulics, Trinidad
 John Atta Opoku, Head of the Asantehene's Lands Department, Gold Coast
 Douglas Alexander Pott, Colonial Administrative Service, Administrative Officer, Nigeria
 Anthony Berthon Roche, Controller of Immigration, Federation of Malaya
 Archdeacon Lewis John Rowe, Archdeacon and Rural Dean of Demerara, British Guiana
 Diomedes Michael Skettos, Colonial Administrative Service, Administrative Officer, Cyprus
 Alfred Cecil Smith  For services to planting in the Federation of Malaya.
 Charles Edward Snell. For public services in Nyasaland.
 James Stevenson  Colonial Survey Service, Director of Surveys and Lands, Sierra Leone
 Captain George Stivala, Commissioner for Malta in Australia
 John Hollingsworth Tanner, Chief Aviation Officer, Tanganyika
 Captain Leonard Maurice Thompson, Manager and Chief Pilot, Bahamas Airways
 Alexander Hamilton Thomson. For services to Local Government in Northern Rhodesia.
 Samuel Seward Toddings. For public services in Bermuda.
 Ts-o Tsun On. For public services in Hong Kong.
 Harold Maxwell Watson, Colonial Audit Service, Director of Audit, Fiji
 James Kerr Watson, Deputy Director of Public Works, Uganda
 Thomas Edwin Went  lately Colonial Engineer, Barbados
 Dennis Charles White, Colonial Administrative Service, Resident, Third Division, Sarawak
 Jane Benyie Williams. For social services in Barbados.
 Donald Bagster Wilson  Colonial Medical Service, Director, East Africa Malaria Unit
 Russell Storey Wollen. For services to the Dairy, Coffee and Pig Industries in Kenya.

Honorary Officers
 Lee Ewe Boon, State Financial Officer, Kedah, Federation of Malaya
 Dato Zainal Abidin Bin Haji Abbas, Deputy Chairman, Rural and Industrial Development Authority, Federation of Malaya
 Mohammad, Wali of Bornu, Northern Regional Minister of Natural Resources, Nigeria
 Mallam Aliyu, Makaman Bida, Northern Regional Minister of Education, Nigeria
 Paulo Neil Kavuma, Katikiro, Uganda
 Fazel Nasser Mawji. For public services in Zanzibar.

Members (MBE)

Military Division 
 Lieutenant Raymond Denzil Andrews 
 Lieutenant-Commander (E) Ronald William Brenton, Royal Navy
 Shipwright Lieutenant-Commander Percy Roy Butler, Royal Navy (Retired)
 Lieutenant-Commander Thomas Hayward De Winton 
 Lieutenant (E) Alfred Louis Giordan  Royal Navy
 Lieutenant-Commander (Sp.) Stanley Eastman Hills  (serving with the Indian Navy)
 Temporary Senior Commissioned Boatswain Leslie Lawrence Janaway, Royal Navy
 Lieutenant (E) Edgar Jack Johnston  Royal Navy (Retired)
 Instructor Lieutenant-Commander Arthur Reginald Jones, Royal Navy
 Captain William Lang, Royal Marines
 Lieutenant Stanley Leonard, Royal Navy
 Lieutenant-Commander (L) Charles Henry Messenger, Royal Navy
 Lieutenant-Commander (S) George William Gundry Midlane  Royal Navy
 Acting Lieutenant-Commander (S) Daniel Joseph O'Leary, Royal Navy
 Lieutenant Edgar Osborne, Royal Navy
 Lieutenant (E) Frederick Charles Rowsell, Royal Navy
 Commissioned Recruiter Frederick Henry Rudge, Royal Navy
 Senior Commissioned Wardmaster William Percival Silk, Royal Navy
 Lieutenant-Commander Horace Robinson Spedding, Royal Navy
 Arthur Reginald Winter, Radio Officer  Service
 Temporary Acting Commissioned Engineer Albert Edward Wood, Royal Navy (lately on loan to the Government of India)
 Major Charles William James Aldred, General List
 Major (Quartermaster) Harold Vivian Alley, Royal Armoured Corps
 Major (Quartermaster) Edwin Ashley, Royal Army Medical Corps
 Warrant Officer Class II William Ashurst, Royal Army Ordnance Corps
 Major Malcolm Stewart Balmain, 15th/19th The King's Royal Hussars, Royal Armoured Corps
 Captain (acting) Eric Andrew Barnes  Combined Cadet Force
 Major Richard Thurstine Basset  The Rifle Brigade (Prince Consort's Own)
 Warrant Office Class II Harry Bell, Royal Army Pay Corps
 Major Marcus Ernest Francis Bell, Corps of Royal Engineers
 Major (Quartermaster) Thomas Benbow, The Devonshire Regiment
 Warrant Officer Class I Albert Sidney Charles Blackshaw, 7th Queen's Own Hussars, Royal Armoured Corps
 Captain Robert Henry Bloomer, The Buffs (Royal East Kent Regiment)
 Major (Quartermaster) Arthur Leonard Bolt, Royal Regiment of Artillery
 Major (now Lieutenant-Colonel) Ernest Laurence Briggs  Corps of Royal Engineers, Territorial Army
 Major John Bywaters, The Middlesex Regiment (Duke of Cambridge's Own)
 Warrant Office Class H John Cardownie, Royal Regiment of Artillery Territorial Army
 Captain Roland Ferguson Cole, Royal Pioneer Corps
 Warrant Office Class II Norman Coleman, The Royal Ulster Rifles. Territorial Army
 Major (Quartermaster) James Reginald Coles, Employed List II (late Royal Army Service Corps)
 Major (temporary) David Craig. G.M., Royal Regiment of Artillery.
 Warrant Officer Class 1 Clifford Claude Cross, Royal Corps of Signals
 Major (Quartermaster) Thomas William Croucher, Corps of Royal Electrical and Mechanical Engineers
 Captain John Davies 
 Major (temporary) (now Captain) Frank Alan Day, The Royal Sussex Regiment
 Major (O.E.O.) James Frederick De Grau, Royal Army Ordnance Corps
 Major (D.O.) Arthur William Dell
 Major (acting) William Dickson, Combined Cadet Force
 Lieutenant (Quartermaster) Francis James Dodd, The Royal Scots Greys (2nd Dragoons), Royal Armoured Corps
 Major Alan Stanley Eccles  Royal Regiment of Artillery, Territorial Army
 Warrant Officer Class I Frederick George Farmer. Royal Army Service Corps
 Major Paul Ernest Archer Folliss, Royal Army Service Corps
 Warrant Officer Class I (acting) Andrew Hepburn Fraser, Royal Tank Regiment, Royal Armoured Corps
 Major The Honourable Ralfe Evans-Freke, The Rifle Brigade (Prince Consort's Own)
 Warrant Officer Class II Harold Douglas French. Royal Army Service Corps
 Major Gary William Fullbrook
 Warrant Officer Class II Frederick John George, Corps of Royal Engineers
 Captain (Quartermaster) Gordon Jack Gillings, Royal Corps of Signals
 Captain Walter Kendal Gott, Royal Pioneer Corps
 Captain (Quartermaster) George Alfred Stuart Graham, 17th/21st Lancers, Royal Armoured Corps
 Warrant Officer Class II Harold Stanley Haden, The Royal Berkshire Regiment (Princess Charlotte of Wales's),
 Major Michael Stephen Hancock
 Warrant Officer Class II Joan Mary Harris  Women's Royal Army Corps
 Major (temporary) Alfred Philip Holland Hartley, The Cheshire Regiment
 Major (Quartermaster) John Henry Cornelius Hawkins, Royal Regiment of Artillery
 Major (O.E.O.) Frederick Roy Horne, Royal Army Ordnance Corps
 Major (Quartermaster) William Edgar Hurst, Employed List II (late Royal Army Service Corps)
 Captain Tom Jagger, The Argyll and Sutherland Highlanders (Princess Louise's)
 Lieutenant-Colonel (local) Arthur John Ketley, Royal Regiment of Artillery
 Major Frank Douglas King, The Wiltshire Regiment (Duke of Edinburgh's).
 Major James John Lamb  Royal Army Ordnance Corps, Territorial Army
 Warrant Officer Class II Frank Larkin, Corps of Royal Engineers, Territorial Army
 Major Anthony David Lewis  The Dorset Regiment
 Major (Quartermaster) Leonard Henry Littlejohn, The Queen's Bays (2nd Dragoon Guards), Royal Armoured Corps
 Warrant Officer Class I Charles Black Macdonald  Corps of Royal Electrical and Mechanical Engineers, Territorial Army
 Major (temporary) John Mackinnon-Little, Corps of Royal Engineers
 Major Alfred Frederick Marich
 Major Thomas Saunders Markham, General List, attached Corps of Royal Electrical and Mechanical Engineers (now retired)
 Major John Fitzgerald May, The Buffs (Royal East Kent Regiment)
 Captain (acting) William John Ferguson McWhor, Army Cadet Force
 Warrant Officer Class I David Benjamin Morris, The Parachute Regiment
 Honorary Major Francis Seward Neale, Combined Cadet Force (now retired)
 Major (acting) Norman McDowell Nevin, Army Cadet Force
 Major (Quartermaster) Francis Herbert Newland, Royal Army Medical Corps
 Major Leonard James Oliver, Corps of Royal Engineers
 Warrant Officer Class I Ralph Reginald Opie, Royal Regiment of Artillery
 Major (temporary) Robert Linnaeus Peat, Royal Pioneer Corps
 Major Edwin Seth Wolfe Perkins, Royal Army Service Corps, Territorial Army
 Major Charles James Phillips, Corps of Royal Electrical and Mechanical Engineers
 Warrant Officer Class I (Artillery Clerk) Albert Joseph Rayner, Royal Regiment of Artillery, Territorial Army
 Major Edgar Lynton Richards  The Parachute Regiment, Territorial Army
 Warrant Officer Class I (acting) Frank Robb, Corps of Royal Electrical and Mechanical Engineers
 Captain (Quartermaster) Walter John Robertson, Royal Corps of Signals
 Major (temporary) Arthur William Robinson, Royal Tank Regiment, Royal Armoured Corps
 Major Stanley David Sharman, Royal Regiment of Artillery
 Captain James Christopher Shaw, The East Lancashire Regiment
 Major (temporary) Pauline Mary Shilton, Women's Royal Army Corps
 Captain Bertram Donald Newton Siminson, Royal Army Educational Corps
 Major John. Richard Guy Stanton, The Royal Sussex Regiment
 Major Frederick Passmore Stewart, Royal Corps of Signals
 Major George Charles Thompson, Army Catering Corps
 Major (D.O.) Ernest Walter Walford, Royal Regiment of Artillery
 Major (Quartermaster) David Clifford Watson, The South Staffordshire Regiment
 Major (acting) (now Lieutenant-Colonel (acting)) Robert Watson, Army Cadet Force
 Major (temporary) Sidney John Watson, Corps of Royal Engineers
 Warrant Officer Class II (now Colour-Sergeant) Francis William Welch, The Gloucestershire Regiment
 Warrant Officer Class II Frederick Thomas Weller, Corps of Royal Military Police
 Warrant Officer Class II Charles Henry Williams, The Welch Regiment, Territorial Army
 Captain (Quartermaster) George Samuel Thomas Woods, The Welch Regiment
 Major Tom Pickering Salisbury Woods, Royal Regiment of Artillery
 Warrant Officer Class I (acting) Eric Anthony Wright, Royal Army Pay Corps
 Major (Quartermaster) Herbert John Ingle Wright, 4th/7th Royal Dragoon Guards, Royal Armoured Corps
 Major Clarence Bavin Adams, Southern Rhodesia Territorial Forces
 Captain Walter Frederick Smith Belton, Rhodesian African Rifles, Southern Rhodesia Military Forces
 Major Cyril Richard Alick Blackwell  Southern Rhodesia Territorial Forces
 Warrant Officer Class I Alexander Thomson Robertson, Royal Corps of Signals, until recently on loan to the Government of India
 Major Arthur Nathaniel Braude  Royal Hong Kong Defence Force
 Major John Charles Michael Grenham, Commanding Officer, Home Guard, Royal Hong Kong Defence Force
 Warrant Officer Class I Mahmud bin Udin, The Malay Regiment
 Major Colin Milton  Officer Commanding, Singapore Army Service Corps
 Major David Nicholls, Royal Army Service Coups, Adjutant, Federation of Malaya Volunteer Army Service Corps
 Squadron Leader Allan John Laird Craig  Royal Air Force
 Squadron Leader Herbert Ernest Hunt, Royal Air Force Regiment
 Squadron Leader Dugald Thomas Moore Lumsden, Royal Air Force
 Squadron Leader Charles Keith Street, Royal Air Force
 Acting Squadron Leader Samuel Gilchrist, Royal Air Force
 Acting Squadron Leader Ronald Charles Instrell  Royal Air Force
 Acting Squadron Leader Stanley James, Royal Air Force
 Acting Squadron Leader Cecil Thomas Nixon Moore, Royal Air Force Regiment
 Acting Squadron Leader Robert James Reid, Royal Air Force Volunteer Reserve
 Acting Squadron Officer Mary Hope Shaw, Women's Royal Air Force
 Flight Lieutenant William Sanders Brokenshire, Royal Air Force
 Flight Lieutenant Apostolos Contaris  Royal Air Force
 Flight Lieutenant John Carey Cottam, Royal Air Force
 Flight Lieutenant Richard Page Hall, Royal Air Force
 Flight Lieutenant Ernest Walter Hassall, Royal Air Force
 Flight Lieutenant John David Jolly, Royal Air Force
 Flight Lieutenant Henry Frederick Victor Marshall, Royal Air Force
 Flight Lieutenant Roy Parsons, Royal Air Force
 Flight Lieutenant Samuel Waters Pattinson, Royal Air Force
 Flight Lieutenant Harold Coatsworth Robinson, Royal Air Force
 Flight Lieutenant George Wardrop Scott  Royal Auxiliary Air Force
 Flight Lieutenant Ronald William Sparkes  Royal Air Force
 Flight Lieutenant Richard Arthur Targett, Royal Air Force
 Flight Lieutenant Clifford John Turner, Royal Air Force
 Flight Lieutenant George Edward Veasey, Royal Air Force
 Acting Flight Lieutenant Horace William Gibbons, Royal Air Force Volunteer Reserve
 Flying Officer William Laurence Lawrenson, Royal Air Force
 Warrant Officer William Stanley Carlile, Royal Air Force
 Warrant Officer Ronald Dixon, Royal Air Force
 Warrant Officer Wilfred Edward Elkins, Royal Air Force
 Warrant Officer Archibald Hay Hamilton, Royal Air Force
 Warrant Officer Reginald John Hole, Royal Air Force
 Warrant Officer Sidney Edward Humphries, Royal Air Force
 Warrant Officer John Henry Large, Royal Air Force
 Warrant Officer Samuel Lee, Royal Air Force
 Warrant Officer Alfred John Lewis, Royal Air Force
 Warrant Officer Frederick George Marsh, Royal Air Force
 Warrant Officer Patrick Joseph O'Reilly, Royal Air Force
 Warrant Officer Leslie Sanderson, Royal Air Force
 Warrant Officer Enock Tempest Southorn, Royal Air Force
 Warrant Officer Charley Henry Stanley, Royal Air Force
 Acting Warrant Officer Tom Dawson, Royal Air Force

Honorary Members
 Warrant Officer Class II Abdul Manap bin Abdullah, The Malay Regiment
 Warrant Officer Class II Amat bin Idris, The Malay Regiment
 Captain Ariffin bin Jamail, The Malay Regiment
 Major Ismail bin Tahar, The Malay Regiment
 Captain Khalid bin Hashim, The Malay Regiment
 Warrant Officer Class II Mohamed Shah bin Mohamed Aris, The Malay Regiment
 Warrant Officer Class I Mohammed Arriff bin Ariffin, The Malay Regiment
 NWarrant Officer Class II Mohammed Yassin bin Ahmad, The Malay Regiment

Civil Division 
 John Adams  lately Adjutant, Ulster Special Constabulary
 Nolan Harris Aldersley, Radio Officer, M.V. Australia Star, Siemens Brothers and Company, Ltd.
 James Lauchland Alexander, Actuary of the Devon and Exeter Savings Bank
 William George Allen, Senior Experimental Officer, Directorate of Electronics Research and Development (Air), Ministry of Supply
 Dorothy Alston, County Secretary, Somerset, Women's Voluntary Services
 Dorothy Lucy Anderson, Centre Organiser, Brentwood, Essex, Women's Voluntary Services. For services during the recent floods in the Eastern Counties.
 John Hay Anderson, Purser, S.S. City of Exeter, Ellerman Lines, Ltd.
 Richard Oakley Andrews  Member, Bedfordshire Agricultural Executive Committee
 Robert Henry John Angus, Superintendent of Stores, Board of Customs and Excise
 Albert Anslow, Production Manager, Joseph Sankey and Sons, Ltd., Wellington, Shropshire
 Victoria Armstrong, Honorary Secretary and Collector, School Savings Group, Ballymena
 Margaret Rachel Arrowsmith. For political and public services in Ebbw Vale.
 Edward Wilkinson Ashby, Chief Tanker Designer, Joseph L. Thompson and Sons, Ltd., Sunderland
 Thomas McMinn Ashford, Chief Smoke Inspector and Technical Engineer, Glasgow Corporation
 Henry Sidney Atkinson  Chairman of Committee, No. 135 (Reigate and Redhill) Squadron, Air Training Corps
 John Atkinson. For political and public services in Derbyshire.
 Thomas John Aven  Higher Executive Officer, National Assistance Board
 Egon Benedict Babler, Chief of Metallurgic and General Research Laboratory, Allen West and Company, Ltd., Brighton
 Horace Charles Baldwin, Senior Executive Officer, Foreign Office
 Harold Barbrook, Food Executive Officer, Ministry of Food. For services during the recent floods in the Eastern Counties.
 Ronald Renton Barker, Senior Auditor, Exchequer and Audit Department
 Samuel John Barlow, Honorary Secretary, Bridport Savings Committee, Dorset
 Sidney George Barnes, Superintendent, Lincolnshire County Constabulary. For services during the recent floods in the Eastern Counties.
 Elsa Barratt. For public services in Skegness.
 Robert Nathan Bates. For political and public services in Norfolk.
 Lewis George Baum, Superintendent and Deputy Chief Constable, Cumberland and Westmorland Constabulary
 Archibald Baxter, Assistant Manager, Shipbuilding Department, Vickers-Armstrongs, Ltd., Barrow-in-Furness
 Sidney John Bayliss, Senior Executive Officer, General Post Office
 Alderman Ernest George Bearcroft. For political and public services in Yorkshire.
 Edwin Alfred Walter Beasant. For political and public services in Swindon.
 Zoe Daphne Morrison Beaton  Area Organiser, East Central Lancashire, Women's Voluntary Services
 Charles William Bellerby, Executive Officer, War Office
 Neil Benson, Foreign Office
 Phyllis Mabel Betts, Assistant Establishment Officer, Church Commissioners
 Leslie Alfred Bird  Senior-Executive Officer, Ministry of Supply
 William George Bird, Senior Executive Offiqer, Ministry of Works
 Margaret Mackenzie Black, Executive Officer, Crown Office, Scotland
 Harold Blackburn, Chairman, Bournemouth Savings Committee
 Arthur Henry Blackwell, Director and Works Manager, David Brown Companies, Meltham, Yorkshire
 Florence Ada Blackwell, Executive Officer, Ministry of Education.
 John Alan Blake. For services as Area Supervisor, Navy, Army and Air Force Institutes, British Army of the Rhine
 Major Henry Rokeby Bond. For services in a civilian capacity in Malaya
 Alfred Edward Booth, District Officer, H.M. Coastguard, Ministry of Transport
 Leslie George Bourne, Convoy Officer, Midland Region Food Flying Squads. For services during the recent floods in the Eastern Counties.
 James McGown Bowes, Honorary Secretary, Rolls-Royce, Ltd., Glasgow, Savings Group
 Grace Mary Darbyshire-Bowles, County Organiser, Norfolk, Women's Voluntary Services. For services during the recent floods in the Eastern Counties.
 Gertrude Lyford Born. For political and public services in Ayrshire.
 Victor Henry Bradley, Deputy Principal, Ministry of Agriculture, Northern Ireland
 Cyril Alfred Brazier, Higher Executive Officer, Ministry of Housing and Local Government
 Frederick Christian Bridges, Senior Executive Officer, Ministry of Supply
 Ann Brooks, Higher Executive Officer, Forestry Commission (Scotland)
 Harry James Brooks, Honorary Secretary, Louth Savings Committee, Lincolnshire
 Walter Frank Brooks, Production Superintendent, Alfred Graham and Company, Ltd., Halifax
 Charles John Brown, Grade 3 Officer, Foreign Office
 Frederick Ernest Francis Brown  Chief Executive Officer, Ministry of Pensions
 Thomas Brown, lately Forester, Dartington Hall, Totnes, South Devon
 Anna Fullerton Bruce, Head of Young Women's Christian Association Service Centre, Bad Oyenihausen, British Army of the Rhine
 William Sandy Bryant, Senior Architect, Ministry of Works
 James Bryce, Manager, Shipyard Plant Department, Harland and Wolff, Ltd., Belfast
 James Buckley, Works Manager, Thomas Robinson and Son, Ltd., Rochdale
 Nellie Elizabeth Budge, Chief Superintendent of Typists. Board of Trade
 Alan Durtnall Bullock, Senior Executive Officer, Ministry of Housing and Local Government
 Harold James Bullock, Secretary, Bristol Port Area Grain Committee
 Arthur Newman Bunce, Clerical Officer, Admiralty
 Emily Isabel Bunce, Matron, Moss Side Hospital, Ministry of Health
 Harold Francis Burnell, Higher Executive Officer, Board of Trade
 Percy Beard Frank Burr, Inspector of Kitchen Waste Collections, Ministry of Agriculture and Fisheries
 Moses Busby, Chairman, Dungannon Rural District Council, Co. Tyrone
 Charles Paul Byrne, Staff Officer, Board of Inland Revenue
 Cicely Cardew, Voluntary Worker, Wormwood Scrubs Boys' Prison
 Alfred Herbert Carding, Works Director, Smart and Brown (Machine Tools), Ltd., Biggleswade
 Thomas Johnstone Lipton Carmichael, Higher Executive Officer, Ministry of Transport
 Joseph King Carson, General Secretary, Ulster Teachers' Union
 Albert Harry Carter, Assistant Chief Constable, Gloucestershire Constabulary
 William Carter, Departmental Manager, Alfred Dunihill, Ltd.
 Arthur Sidney Cartwright, Director and Secretary, Oak Tanning Company, Ltd.
 William Cater, Executive Officer Cabinet Office
 Augustus Cave, Senior Executive Officer, General Post Office
 Charles Chadwick, Honorary Secretary, Milnrow Savings Committee, Lancashire
 Walter Robert Chamberlain, Chairman, Nuneaton Local Employment Committee
 Claude Edwin Channing, Higher Executive Officer, Government Actuary's Department
 Frederick Charles Chapman, Manager, Beamish Mary, Handen Hold, Twizell Burn and Alma Collieries, Durham Division, National Coal Board
 Marjorie Joan Chenhalls, Civil Assistant, War Office
 Isidore Civval, Inspector of Taxes, Board of Inland Revenue
 Frank Clapham, Trade Union Vice-Chairman, Wolverhampton District Advisory Committee, Midlands Regional Board for Industry
 Duncan Walker Clark. For services to Drama in Falkirk
 Robert Noel Lightfoot Clarke, Plant Manager, Imperial Chemical Industries, Ltd., Alkali Division
 Doris Marian Cleland, Senior Executive Officer, Ministry of National Insurance
 Harold Cocker, Works Manager, Beatson, Clark and Company, Ltd., Rotherham
 Catherine Mary Codling, Senior Clerk, East Lancashire Territorial and Auxiliary Forces Association
 Kenneth Barrett Colam, Chief Officer, Wakefield Fire Brigade
 Llewellyn Lancelot Cole, Senior Executive Officer, Ministry of Works
 Bert Coulson Coles  Headmaster, Alford Secondary Modern School, Lincoln-shire. For services during the recent floods in the Eastern Counties.
 Charles Stratum Colley, Housing Manager, Ruislip-Northwood Urban District Council
 Dorothy Joan Collihole, Director, Periodicals Department, British Council
 Joseph Walker Collinson. For political and public services in Thornaby-on-Tees.
 Ayleen Finlay Conway, Head of the Probation and Prison Welfare Department, Women's Voluntary Services
 John Herbert Cooke, Chairman, Thornbury Rural District Council, Gloucestershire
 Leslie Arthur Coombs. For political services.
 Denis Edward James Cooper, Chairman, Lochbroom District Council. For services during the hurricane in North-West Scotland
 James Cormack, Superintendent, Society for Welfare and Teaching of the Blind (Edinburgh and South-East Scotland)
 Arthur Edmund Cotton, Deputy Superintendent, Directorate General of Works, Air Ministry
 Kenneth Edgar Cotton, Chief Engineer, East Suffolk and Norfolk River Board. For services during the recent floods in the Eastern Counties.
 Albert Walter Cox, Principal Assistant, Legal and Parliamentary Department, London County Council
 Herbert David Cox, Principal Surveyor, Tithe Redemption Commission
 Vera Cox, Marketing Organiser, National Federation of Women's Institutes
 Frederick John Baker Craighill, Senior Executive Officer. Government Hospitality Fund
 Captain Quentin Charles Alexander Craufurd, Royal Navy (Retired), Honorary Secretary, Dungeness Lifeboat Station
 Ada Gertrude Creegan, Chairman, Lewisham Street Groups Savings Subcommittee
 William Henry John Crees, Higher Executive Officer, Ministry of Transport
 Sidney Cresswell  Superintendent, Staffordshire Constabulary
 Charles Henry Cribbes, Senior Executive Officer, Ministry of National Insurance
 Harry Critchley, Training Service Officer I, Ministry of Labour and National Service
 Mabel Winifred Cross, Local Representative
 Surbiton. Forces Help Society And Lord Roberts Workshops
 Edith Annie Crossley. For political and public services in Barkston Ash.
 Frederick George Crouch, lately Chief Male Nurse, Tooting Bee Mental Hospital
 Ada Crozier, Personnel Manager, Wm. Ewart and Son, Ltd., Belfast
 Douglas Cruden, Senior Fishery Officer, Scottish Home Department
 Harold Archibald Gray Curtis, Higher Executive Officer. Ministry of National Insurance
 Wilfred John Curtis, Surveyor, City District (London), Board of Customs and Excise
 Herbert John Cutler, Head of Furniture Department, High Wycombe College of Further Education
 William Henry Daniels, Vice-Chairman, Southampton Local Employment Committee
 Arthur Ernest Davies, Musical Director, Luton Girls' Choir
 John Lewis Eavies, Engineer and Surveyor, Leatherhead Urban District Council
 Gertrude Debrit Deave. For political and public services in Lewisham.
 Dorothy Annie Denny, Grade 3 Officer, Foreign Office
 Charles Montagu Dering, Senior Experimental Officer, Admiralty
 Sydney Edgar Devonald, lately Chairman, London and Southern England District, Joint District Scrap Drive Committee, British Iron and Steel Federation
 George Richard Septimus Dixon, Producer, School Broadcasting, British Broadcasting Corporation
 Major John Robert Donnelly, Administrative Secretary, Ex-Services Welfare Society
 Mary Emma Masterton Dougans, Private Secretary to the Permanent Secretary, Admiralty
 Thomas Scatchard Drake, Warden, Queen Elizabeth Home of Recovery for the Blind, Torquay
 Alfred Lever Duggan. For political and public services in Bristol.
 Alderman Thomas Dunn, Chairman, Barn-staple District Committee, Devon Agricultural Executive Committee.
 Squadron Leader William Harry Dunton, Civilian Substitution Officer, Royal Air Force School of Photography
 Alexander Haldon Dykes, Chief Engineer, M.V. Hibernian Coast, Coast Lines, Ltd.
 Catherine Dynes, Night Superintendent, Royal Victoria Hospital, Belfast
 John Goslett Edwards, Assistant Civil Engineer, H.M. Dockyard, Chatham. For services during the recent floods in the Eastern Counties.
 Reginald William Elkins, Regional Collector of Taxes, Board of Inland Revenue
 Jeannie Elliott. For political and public services in Nottingham.
 Albert Wilfrid Ellis. For political and public services in Essex.
 Stanley George Elmer, Executive Officer, War Office
 Albert Josiah Evans, Headmaster, Benfleet Secondary Modern School, Essex. For services during the recent floods in the Eastern Counties.
 Evan Rees Evans, Farmer, Llandyssul, Cardiganshire
 Gladys May Everett, Higher Executive Officer, Ministry of Health
 Charles Henry Exley  Higher Executive Officer, Ministry of National Insurance
 Basil Grenville Fairbrother, Commissioner for the Church Army with the British Army of the Rhine
 Geoffrey Thomas Berridge Fall, Chief Accountant, Shipping Federation, Ltd.
 Fraser Farquharson, Chief Superintendent, City of Glasgow Police
 Harry Farrer, Skipper of a Fishing Vessel
 Catherine Jeanne Felton, Executive Officer, Cabinet Office
 Daisy Fenwick, Grade IV Clerk, United Kingdom Trade Commissioner's Office, Winnipeg
 William Nicol Forrest, Assistant Director of Supplies, H.M. Stationery Office
 Arnold Percy Forster, Placing Officer, Treforest Trading Estate, Ministry of Labour and National Service
 Marjorie Beatrice Forster, Personal Secretary, Colonial Development Corporation
 Sidney Charles Hudson Fossett, Works Manager, Carriage and Wagon Works, North Eastern Region, Railway Executive
 Donald Max Fountain, Agent, John Mowlem and Company, Ltd.
 Victor Reginald-Fox, Assistant Waterguard Superintendent, Newhaven, Board of Customs and Excise
 Dorothy Violet Franklin, Ward Sister, St. Bernard's (Mental) Hospital, Southall
 Albert Marskell Freeman, Headmaster, 1 Welling Secondary School for Boys, Kent
 Margaret Wilson Frew, Organising Secretary, the Erskine (Paraplegic) Coach and Comforts Fund, Renfrewshire
 William Garner  Superintendent, Norfolk Constabulary. For services during the recent floods in the Eastern Counties.
 Samuel James Garton, Chief Investigator, Historic Buildings, Ministry of Housing and Local Government
 Minnie Gatenby, Sister Midwife, West Middlesex Hospital, Isleworth
 James Gayler, Chairman, London Regional Schools Advisory Savings Committee
 George Faimilo Gibson  For public services in Nottinghamshire.
 Grace Gidley, lately Head Assistant, Southern Grove Lodge, London County Council Welfare Department
 Arthur Edgar Gilbert, Local Fuel Overseer for the City of Birmingham
 William Joseph Montague Gladden, Higher Executive Office, Air Ministry
 Joseph James Cecil Goulder, Clerk to the South Kesteven Rural District Council
 Edith Amy Gray. Headmistress, Bisbrooke Church of England School, Rutland
 Victor Gray, Naval Architect, Cochrane and Sons, Ltd., Selby
 William Llewelyn Alexander Gray, Chairman. North-East Wales War Pensions Committee
 Alec Alfred Green, Senior Experimental Officer, Pest Infestation Laboratory, Department of Scientific and Industrial Research
 Leslie William Green, Senior Executive Officer, Ministry of Civil Aviation
 Stephen Herbert Green, G.M|Engineer and Manager, Drainage Department, Thurrock Urban District Council. For services during the recent floods in the Eastern Counties.
 William Henry Green, Senior Executive Officer, Ministry of National Insurance
 Rosalys Joan Griffith, Examiner of Acts, House of Lords
 Jack Griffiths, Clerk to the Sheerness Urban District Council. For services during the recent floods in the Eastern Counties.
 Horace Frederick Griggs, Senior Executive Officer, Ministry of Civil Aviation
 Arthur Thomas Grimer, Senior Executive Officer, Ministry of National Insurance
 George Groves, Manager, Clipsham Stone Quarries, Oakham
 Leonard Arthur Grudgings, Chairman, Regional Schools Advisory Savings Committee, East Midlands Region
 William Joseph Gwilliam  Alderman, Pembroke Borough Council
 Hubert Charles Langley Hackney, Senior Executive Officer, Ministry of Pensions
 Ernest Nelson Hall, Chief Executive Officer, Ministry of Supply
 Robert Joseph Reed Hancock, Senior Structural Engineer, Ministry of Works
 William Hanke. For political and public services in the West Midlands.
 Captain Thomas Jewitt Hansen, Master, S.S. Cormount, Wm. Cory and Son, Ltd.
 William Hudson Birrell Harley, Finance Secretary, British Broadcasting Corporation
 Ralph Hart, Assistant Regional Food Officer, Northern Region, Ministry of Food
 Hattie Dorinda Hartley. Senior Executive Officer. Ministry of Food
 Thomas George Haughton, Lately Secretary and Director, Churches Youth Welfare Council, Northern Ireland
 George William Haw, lately Secretary-Manager, Pocklington Co-operative Society
 John Allen Hawkins, Grade 3 Officer, Ministry of Labour and National Service
 Winefride Hayes, Chief Superintendent of Typists, Ministry of Works
 Richard Heath, Resident Warden, Claremont Rehabilitation Centre for Dock Workers. National Dock Labour Board
 Peter Henderson  Area Labour Officer, East Fife Area, Scottish Division, National Coal Board
 Walter Henderson, Executive Officer, London Museum
 Francis Austin Henley, Sales Manager, Reinforced Shuttlecocks, Ltd.
 Constance Habbegell Henry, Higher Executive Officer, Ministry of Transport
 Harold Ernest Henson, Executive Officer, Regional Office, Leeds, Board of Trade
 Joseph Gordon Higgins, lately Superintendent, Carmarthenshire Constabulary
 Joseph Edward Hilder, Manager, Watford Employment Exchange, Ministry of Labour and National Service
 Charles Biglin Hill, Farmer, Easington, Yorkshire. For services during the recent floods in the Eastern Counties.
 Frederick William Hill, Joint Managing Director, F. W. Hill (Bognor Regis), Ltd., Builders and Contractors
 Harry Charles Hill, Superintendent, War Department Constabulary
 Henry Joseph Arthur Hill, Sales Manager, London, British European Airways
 John Frederick Hilton, Secretary, Trade Union Side, Departmental Joint Industrial Council
 Victor Arthur Hinde, Higher Executive Officer, Ministry of Civil Aviation
 Edward Charles Histed, Chief Draughtsman, Admiralty
 Charles Stansfield Kitchen, Resident Geologist, Tanganyika Coalfields and Iron Investigation, Colonial Development Corporation
 Wilfred John Hobbs, Works Manager, Drayton Regulator and Instrument Company, Ltd., West Drayton, Middlesex
 Enid Sidney Hobson, Executive Officer, London Hostels Association, Ltd.
 Albert Edward Hocking, Member, National Executive Council, British Legion
 Brian Holmes, Assistant Constructor, Admiralty. For services during the recent floods in the Eastern Counties.
 Cecil William Hopkins, Inspector of Taxes (Higher Grade), Board of Inland Revenue
 William Watson Hopkinson, Station Engineer, Dartford and Belvedere, South Eastern Gas Board. For services during the recent floods in the Eastern Counties.
 Frederick Alfred Horton, Steward, H.M. Prison, Wandsworth
 William Houghton, lately General Manager, Ipswich Beet Sugar Factory
 Sydney Charles Edward Howard, Higher Executive Officer, Ministry of Transport
 William Roy Howells, Chief Officer, Herefordshire Fire Brigade
 Cyril Frank Howes, Higher Executive Officer, Board of Trade
 Harold Hoyle, Assistant to Operating Superintendent (Freight Trains), Eastern and North Eastern Regions, Railway Executive
 Charles Henry Hudson  Chairman, King's Lynn and District Local Employment Committee
 Alfred David Hull, Costing Secretary, British Federation of Master Printers
 Noel Kathleen Hunnybun, Senior Psychiatric Social Worker, Child Guidance Department, Tavistock Clinic, London
 Mary Roy Hunter, Production Manager, Ethicon Suture Laboratories, Edinburgh
 Thomas Chalmers Hunter, Distribution Engineer, Fife Sub-Area, South East Scotland Electricity Board
 William Imlach, Skipper of steam trawler Loch Awe. For services during the hurricane in North-West Scotland
 Robert Rhudd Innes. For political services in Edinburgh.
 Morris Isaacs, Supervisor of Factories, Jackson Associated Manufacturers, Ltd., Newcastle upon Tyne
 Ernest Samuel James, Higher Clerical Officer, Admiralty
 Celia Jarratt, Senior Major, Salvation Army. For services during the recent floods in the Eastern Counties.
 Doris Gertrude Jarvis, Clerical Officer, Home Office
 Arthur Ernest Jaynes, lately Chief Clerk, Gloucester District Probate Registry
 Francis Robert Jefford, Chief Sanitary Inspector, Municipal Borough of Cheltenham
 Aileen Machenry Johnston (Lady Fraser-Tytler), lately Chief Officer of the National Institute of Houseworkers
 Alan Edgar Johnston, Senior Executive Officer, Ministry of Transport
 Bessie Patience Johnston, County Director, City of Glasgow Branch, British Red Cross Society
 Anna Jones, School Meals Organiser, Denbighshire
 William Emlyn David Jones, Assistant County Agricultural Officer (Advisory), Pembrokeshire, Ministry of Agriculture and Fisheries
 Wilfred Harold Jupe, Higher Executive Officer, Ministry of Supply
 William George Keable, Higher Executive Officer, Ministry of Supply
 Arthur Stanley Keeling, Midland District Engineer, South Western Division, Docks and Inland Waterways Executive
 Robert Kerr, Deputy Accountant, North Western Gas Board
 Francis William Ernest King, Vice-Chairman, Amersham Rural District Council
 George King, Senior Research Chemist, Albright and Wilson, Ltd.
 Harold Alfred King, Depot Superintendent, Stockport, North Western Road Car Company, Ltd.
 Frank Oliver Kitteringham, Higher Executive Officer, Board of Trade
 Harold Frederick Knell, Sub-Area Manager (Kent), South Eastern Electricity Board. For services during the recent floods in the Eastern Counties.
 Captain William Anthony Kyne, Master, S.S. Ramsay, Bolton Steam Shipping Company, Ltd.
 Mary Marguerite Lace, Regional Organiser, North-Eastern Region, Women's Voluntary Services
 Albert Haynes Laidlaw, Chief Draughtsman, Vosper, Ltd., Portsmouth
 Ralph Thornton Lakin, Chief Engineer, Whiteley Electrical Radio Company, Ltd., Mansfield
 Alfred Dupear Lambert, Chief Engineer, S.S. Gardenia, Stag Line, Ltd.
 David Noble Lang, Area General Manager, South Western Division, National Coal Board
 John Henry Last, Chief Passport Officer, Office of the High Commissioner for the United Kingdom in the Union of South Africa
 Herbert Vincent Laurie, Headmaster, Thorparch Grange Approved School, Boston Spa, Yorkshire
 James Russell Lawrie, Headmaster, Kingsland School, Peebles
 William Leitch  General Manager, Clydebank Co-operative Society
 Ceridwen Lewis, Matron, Ministry of Pensions Hospital, Rockwood, Llandaff, Cardiff
 Grace Lewis, Senior Adviser in Dairying and Poultry-keeping, North Region, Edinburgh and East of Scotland College of Agriculture
 Mary Dorothy Lewis  Chairman, Cardiff Street Groups Savings Sub-Committee
 Reginald Gwyn Leyshon, Secretary and Comptroller, Anglo-Celtic Watch Company, Ltd., Ystradgynlais, Swansea
 Richard Henry Linnell, Factory Superintendent, British Thomson-Houston Company, Ltd., Leicester
 Leonard Edmund Reuben Loader, Chief Officer, Anglesey Fire Brigade
 Albert William Lovelock, Development and Production Manager, S. G. Brown, Ltd. Watford
 Reginald Lowen, Establishment Officer, National Maritime Museum
 George Joseph Lunnon, Senior Executive Officer, Colonial Office
 William Arthur McAdam  Commandant, Metropolitan Special Constabulary
 Anne Montgomery MacArthur, Headmistress, Coleridge Road Secondary Modern School for Girls, Sheffield
 Annie McCallum. For political services in Glasgow.
 Edith Margaret McClintock, Superintendent of Typists, Supreme Court of Judicature, Northern Ireland
 Doris McDonald, Honorary Secretary, Street Savings Group, South Shields, and Chairman, South Shields Street Groups Sub-Committee
 James MacGregor, Works' Manager, Thermotank, Ltd., Glasgow
 Bernard McGuirk, Manager, Liverpool (Leece Street) Employment Exchange, Ministry of Labour and National Service
 Lieutenant-Commander Robert Mckellar  (Retired), Captain Superintendent, National Sea Training Schools, Gravesend
 Elizabeth Fotheringham Mckie, Principal, Logan and Johnstone Pre-Nursing College, Glasgow
 Thomas McLauchlan  Chief Traffic Superintendent, North Eastern Region, General Post Office
 Kenneth Macleod, Superintendent and Deputy Chief Constable. Renfrew and Bute Constabulary
 Gordon McLoughlin, Senior Executive Officer, National Debt Office
 Euphemia MacMillan, Matron. Dunclutha Children's Home, Kirn, Argyll
 Norman McNeilly, Principal, Boys' Model Primary School, Belfast
 David Henry McVeigh, District Manager, Lincoln District, Road Haulage Executive. For services during the recent floods in the Eastern Counties.
 Leonard Emile Magnusson, Senior Executive Engineer, General Post Office
 Thomas Walter Marchant, Higher Executive Officer, Ministry of Supply
 Richard Harry Wakeling Marks, Member, Devonport Local Committee of the Royal Naval Benevolent Trust
 Florence Marsden, Member, Hull Savings Committee
 Albert William John Martin, Accountant, Ministry of Fuel and Power
 Frederick Martin, Deputy Clerk of the Crown and Peace, Belfast and County Antrim
 Leonard Frank Martin, Manager, Government Shipping Department, Hogg Robinson and Capel-Cure, Ltd.
 William Martin  Member, National Union of Agricultural Workers
 Elsie Maskell, Clerical Assistant, Board of Trade
 John Patrick Matthews, Maintenance Master, R.A.S.C. Fleet, Sheerness. For services during the recent floods in the Eastern Counties.
 Florrie Wright Maxim, lately Ward Sister, Birch Hill Hospital, Rochdale, Lancashire
 Herbert George Maybury, Records Officer, Imperial War Graves Commission
 Percy William Bell Mayes  Chairman, Erith Local Employment Committee
 Florence Mary Mears, Senior Executive Officer, General Post Office
 Francis Arnold Meldrum, Area Engineer, Telephone Manager's Office, Liverpool, General Post Office
 Charles Percival Menday, Food Executive Officer, Ministry of Food
 Alexander Mennie  Chairman, Glasgow Central Disablement Advisory Committee
 John Harold Middleton, Secretary of the Civil Service Sports Council
 Robert Headley Miers, Drainage Engineer, Ministry of Agriculture and Fisheries. For services during the recent floods in the Eastern Counties.
 Ronald Mildenhall, Higher Executive Officer, H.M. Treasury
 Celia Blair Miller, Joint Honorary Secretary, Henley and District Housing Trust
 William Alexander Pyper Milne Area Cold Storage Officer, Ministry of Food
 Alderman Henry Rawson Milner, Chairman, Bridlington Youth Employment Committee
 Observer Commander Frank William Mitchell, Deputy Commandant, Southern Area, Royal Observer Corps
 John Christopher Morgan, Chairman, Atcham District Committee, Salop Agricultural Executive Committee
 Percy Morrell, lately Generation Engineer (Operation), Northern Group, British Electricity Authority
 Frank Moss, Maintenance Superintendent, Garringtons, Ltd., Darleston
 John Frederick Michael Mowat  For political and public services in Wrexham.
 Edward Arthur Moxey, Chief Officer, Great Yarmouth Fire Brigade
 George Frederick Mullinger, Surveyor, Grade I, Ministry of Agriculture and Fisheries
 Robert Charles Mundy, Bulk Contracts Manager, Ericsson Telephones Ltd.
 Margaret Macartney Murray, Matron, Herrison (Mental) Hospital, Dorchester, Dorset
 Captain Alexander Naismtth, Master, M.V. Anshun, China Navigation Company, Ltd.
 John Henry Naylor, District Commercial Engineer, Barnsley District, Yorkshire Electricity Board
 John Rowan Nesbit, Chief Cashier and Head Office Manager, Scottish Omnibuses, Ltd.
 Observer Commander Herbert George Newman, Commandant, No. 15 Group, Royal Observer Corps, Cambridge
 Winifred Curtis Nichols, Senior Executive Officer, Office of the Public Trustee
 William John Northmore, lately General Foreman of Works, Admiralty
 Evelyn Jessie Blackett-Ord, National Vice-Chairman. Women's Section. British Legion
 Edward William James Osborne  Chief Superintendent, Metropolitan Police Force
 Joseph Aloysius Vincent O'Shea, Clerical Officer, Board of Trade
 William Kingdon Owen  Chairman, Neath Juvenile Advisory Committee
 Edith Annie Parker  For political and public services in Salford.
 Carl Pater Parkinson, Skipper of the Fishing Vessel Apt
 Louis Emanuel Parsons, Senior Experimental Officer, British Museum (Natural History)
 Samuel John Partridge, County Welfare Officer, East Riding of Yorkshire. For services during the recent floods in the Eastern Counties.
 Hubert Newton Peake, Chairman, Banbury Committee, Air Training Corps
 Bertram Wilson Pearce, Temporary Clerk, Grade I, Ministry of Works
 William Donald Pearce, Superintendent of Works, Office of the Receiver for Metropolitan Police
 Frank Pearson, Manager, Heavy Duty Cooking Apparatus Department, Wm. Green and Company (Ecclesfield), Ltd., Sheffield
 William Henry Pearson  Kent County Organiser, National Union of Agricultural Workers
 Isabella Agnes Pettitt, Assistant Honorary Secretary, Essex, Soldiers, Sailors and Airmen's Families Association. For services during the recent floods in the Eastern Counties.
 Geoffrey Elisha Phillippo, Clerk to the Lincolnshire River Board. For services during the recent floods in the Eastern Counties.
 Melbourne Griffith Phillips, Superintendent, Bristol City Police Force
 Sydney Pitt  Headmaster, Russell Scott County Primary School, Denton, Lancashire
 Cyril Marks Plowman, Adviser to the Industrial Relations Committee of the Gas Council
 Lilian Alice Plowman, Grade 4 Officer, Ministry of Labour and National Service
 Robert George Pointer, Manager, Mile Cross Silk Mills, Francis Hinde and Sons, Ltd., Norwich
 Aubrey Franklyn Pool, Employer Member, Cornwall District Advisory Committee, South Western Regional Board for Industry
 George Arthur Henry Edward Poole, Factory Manager, Joseph Lucas, Ltd., Birmingham
 James Arthur Porter. For political and public services in Liverpool.
 Isabel Muriel Potts. For political and public services in Middlesex.
 Ernest Baden Powell, Honorary Secretary, Brecon and District Savings Committee, South Wales
 Ronald Rees Powell  Chairman, Reigate Unit Committee, and Southern Area Representative, Sea Cadet Council
 Stanley Prissick, Director and Secretary, Henry Scarr, Ltd., Hessle, East Yorkshire
 Phyllis Mary Helen Pritchard, County Organiser, Lindsey, Women's Voluntary Services. For services during the recent floods in the Eastern Counties.
 Edith May Hedley-Prole, Centre Organiser, Lambeth, Women's Voluntary Services
 Margaret Joan Pryer, Higher Executive Officer, H.M. Treasury
 John Herbert Quayle, Divisional Engineer, Lincolnshire River Board. For services during the recent floods in the Eastern Counties.
 George Frederick Quilter, Brigade Secretary, St. John Ambulance Brigade
 Joseph Rea, Divisional Officer, Wiltshire Fire Service
 Iden Robert Reed, London Outdoor Representative, Passenger Department, Cunard Steamship Company, Ltd.
 John Reginald Reed, Branch Accountant and Office Manager, English Electric Company, Ltd., Preston
 Harry Hepburn Reid  Headmaster, St. Helena Boys' Secondary Modern School, Colchester
 James Reid. For political and public services in Dumfries-shire.
 James Ernest Reid, District Inspector, Royal Ulster Constabulary
 Herbert Pinder Reynolds, Head Postmaster, Weymouth, Dorset, General Post Office
 Arthur Richards, Chief Draughtsman, Admiralty
 George Tilghman Richards, Senior Research Assistant, Science Museum
 John William Rigby, Staff Officer, Board of Inland Revenue
 Ernest Armstrong Ritchie, Traffic Superintendent, Belfast Corporation Transport Department
 Chambers Edward Ritson, Member, North West Area Seedcrushers' Committee
 Austin Horace Cecil Roberts, Senior Executive Officer, Charity Commission
 Frank Roberts, Cleansing Superintendent, Birkenhead County Borough
 Thomas Herbert Roberts, Higher Executive Officer, War Office
 Robina Robertson, Superintendent, District Nurses' Association, Londonderry
 Donald Goodall Roper, Higher Executive Officer, Ministry of Agriculture and Fisheries
 Oswald Stafford Rose, Agricultural Development Officer to the British Sugar Corporation
 Alexandrina Ross, Nursing Sister, Casualty Ward and Radiotherapy Ward, Glasgow Royal Infirmary
 Jeannette Susannah Gertrude Rowe, Honorary Secretary, Schools Savings Committee, Belfast
 William Francis Rowland  For political and public services in Glamorgan.
 Ivor Robertson Roy, Column Officer, South Eastern Area Fire Brigade, Scotland
 Francis Walter Ruzbridge, Chief Clerk, South Eastern Divisional Road Engineer's Office, Ministry of Transport
 Ralph Ernest Sadler, Assistant Engineer (New Works), Eastern Region, Railway Executive
 Reginald Dennis Salmon, Chief Development Engineer, Creed and Company, Ltd.
 Ethel Alice Sampson, Matron, Old People's Home, The Laurels, Oxford
 Mary Bell Sanderson, Honorary Secretary, Women's Voluntary Services, Scotland
 Alice Ada Saville, Technical Nursing Officer, Reading Nursing Appointments Office, Ministry of Labour and National Service
 James Watson Scholes  Chairman, Dumfriesshire Savings Committee
 Alfred Edward Scott, Assistant Regional Manager, London North-West Regional Office, Central Land Board and War Damage Commission
 Alfred Trotter Scott, Honorary Secretary, Ayr and South Ayrshire Committee, St. Andrew's Ambulance Association
 Dorothy Edith Scott, Chief Superintendent of Typists, Ministry of Materials
 Harry Neill Scott, Manager, Outside Engineering Department. Harland and Wolff, Ltd., Glasgow
 Arthur Richard Sculthorpe, General Secretary, National Deaf-Blind Helpers' League
 Isabel Frances Teresa Shallcrass, Higher Executive Officer, Ministry of Education
 Frank Hamblyn Sharpe, Inspector of Taxes (Higher Grade). Board of Inland Revenue
 William Shaw, Flax Grader, Ministry of Materials
 Francis Ernest Shippobotham, Manager, Claims Department, Western Welsh Omnibus Company, Ltd.
 Mary Elizabeth Short  Alderman, East Suffolk County Council and Eye Borough Council
 Donald George Henry Simmonds, Principal Cost Officer, War Office
 Abe Simpson, Divisional Officer, Fife Area Fire Brigade
 Margaret Beryl Skelly, Private Secretary to the Rt. Hon. C. R. Attlee  For political services.
 Henry Atkinson Slater. For political and public services in Lancashire.
 Beatrice Emma Slocombe. For political and public services in Keighley.
 Madeline Small. For political and public services in Belfast.
 Captain Albert Smedley  Secretary, Civil Defence Technical Training School, Taymouth Castle, Perthshire
 Charles Smith, Senior Sales Executive, Cooper and Roe, Ltd.
 Elsie Emma Margaret Smith, Superintendent, Metropolitan Women Police
 Everitt Barnard Smith, Skipper of the Fishing Vessel Sir Lancelot
 Frederick William Stephen Smith, Senior Executive Officer, Ministry of Food
 Jessie Gladys Smith, Assistant Secretary and Treasurer, Fulham and Hammer-smith Division, Soldiers', Sailors' and Airmen's Families Association
 Mabel Georgina Smith, Headmistress, Longford Park Open Air School, Stretford
 Thomas Alfred Smith, Chief Engineer, Alley and MacLellan, Ltd., Glasgow
 Walter Wilson Smith, Chief Technician, Plastic Surgery Department, Ballochmyle Hospital, Ayrshire
 Joseph James John Smythe, Non-Technical Grade I, Royal Ordnance Factory, Swynnerton
 Jeannie Spence, Vice-President, Dundee and District Union of Jute and Flax Workers
 William Harry Spice, Control Officer, Grade I, British Mission to Soviet Occupation Forces in Germany
 Ernest Francis Spillan, Telecommunications Technical Officer I, Ministry of Civil Aviation
 Frank Edward Grant Spokes, Senior Executive Officer, No. 25 Maintenance Unit, Royal Air Force, Hartlebury
 Charles Mervyn Stanford, Executive Officer, Central Office of Information
 Bertram Dean Stanley, Secretary and Accountant. East Kent Road Car Company, Ltd.
 James Dawson Steel, Chief Area Milk Officer, Scotland, Ministry of Food
 Muriel Emia Stephens, Postmistress, Pontnewydd Sub-Post Office (S), Newport, Monmouthshire
 Thomas Stephenson, Senior Executive Officer, Scottish Education Department
 Betty Ellen May Stern, Welfare Member. Women's Voluntary Services, Korea
 Donald Arnott Stewart, Consulting Engineer. For services to the Ministry of Works.
 George Alexander Stewart, Assistant Secretary and Librarian, Royal Society of Edinburgh
 James Ramsay Stirling, Higher Executive Officer, Ministry of Food
 Sarah Story. For political and public services in Newcastle upon Tyne.
 George Burder Stratton, Librarian. Zoological Society of London
 John William Strydom, Cashier, The Vacuum Oil Company, Ltd., Coryton Refinery. For services during the recent floods in the Eastern Counties.
 Nina Edith Sturdee, lately Personal Private Secretary to the Prime Minister
 Margaret Hilda Talbot. For political and public services in Preston.
 Sidney Cyril Tarry, Chairman, St. Dunstan's Physiotherapy Advisory Committee
 Cyril Balfour Taylor. For political and public services in Kingston-upon-Hull.
 Frances Mary Graham-Taylor. For political and public services in Wessex.
 James Ingram Taylor, Deputy Chief Engineer, Kent River Board. For services during the recent floods in the Eastern Counties.
 Samuel Ewart Taylor, Deputy Principal Officer, Ministry of Health and Local Government, Northern Ireland
 Henry Thomas  Chairman, Barry and Penarth Joint Food Control Committee
 Margaret Louisie Thomas, Alderman, County Borough Organiser, Wakefield, Women's Voluntary Services
 William Albert Thomas, Honorary Secretary, Pontardulais Choral Society, South Wales
 Captain William Evan Thomas  Member, Pembroke County Agricultural Executive Committee
 Annie Nicol Thompson, Lady Superintendent
 Charles Thompson's Mission, Birkenhead
 George Thompson, District Secretary for Canada and the United States of America, National Union of Seamen
 John Seymour Thompson, Chief Metallurgist and Production Manager, Durham Chemicals, Ltd., Birtley
 Mary Elizabeth Thomson, County Organiser, Fife. Women's Voluntary Services
 William Henry Tichbon, Chief Inspector, British Overseas Airways Corporation
 Augusta Annie Tomlinson, Methodist Welfare Worker, Middle East Land Forces
 Captain Philip Henry Trimmer  Royal Navy (Retired), Honorary Secretary, Guildford Unit Committee, Sea Cadet Corps
 Helen Millicent Troup, Social Worker, Edinburgh
 Stanley Christopher Tucker, Higher Executive Officer, Board of Inland Revenue
 David Tudor  For political and public services in North Wales.
 Raymond Tuft, Divisional Superintendent, Leicester Division, Birmingham and Midland Motor Omnibus Company, Ltd.
 Henry Turner, Foundry Manager, International Combustion, Ltd., Derby
 Nelly Turner, Works Manageress, E. Ulingworth and Company, Ltd., Suttonin-Ashfield
 Janie Tweed, lately Honorary Secretary, Larne Music Festival Association
 Louie Tweedy  County Borough Organiser, Tynemouth, Women's Voluntary Services
 Francis George Valentine Vincent, Plant Engineer, Supermarine Works, Vickers-Armstrongs, Ltd., Swindon
 James Eric Vine, Intelligence Officer, War Office
 Charles George Vokes, Senior Executive Officer, War Office
 Grace Mary Wacey, Secretary, University of London Institute of Education
 George Benjamin James Wadley, Higher Executive Officer, Admiralty
 Doris Walker, Controller of Typists (Outstations), Air Ministry
 John William Walker, Senior Executive Officer, Air Ministry
 James Wallbey. For public services in Penclawdd, Glamorganshire.
 Fanny Walwyn, Higher Executive Officer, Commonwealth Relations Office
 Catherine Waterhouse, Domiciliary Midwife, King's Lynn, Norfolk
 Doris Prudence Waters, Head of Old People's Welfare Department, Women's Voluntary Services
 Dilys Mary Francis-Watkins, Higher Executive Officer, Office of H.M. Procurator General and Treasury Solicitor
 Fred Akeroyd Watson, Senior Executive Officer, Ministry of Pensions
 John Smith Watson, Chief Sanitary Inspector and Housing Officer, Border Rural District Council
 Stanley Gordon Strange Watts, Accountant, Board of Customs and Excise
 Edwin Webb, Secretary-Manager, Church of England Soldiers', Sailors' and Airmen's Institute, Aldershot
 Charles Thomas Webster, Senior Experimental Officer, Joint Fire Research Organisation, Department of Scientific and Industrial Research
 Edward Marshall Wells, Assistant Principal Clerk, Board of Inland Revenue
 Alba Gladys Ivy Colchester-Wemyss, Borough Organiser, Chesterfield, Women's Voluntary Services
 Francis West, Skipper of the Motor Drifter Honeydew
 Thomas Whalley, Chairman, Northwich Savings Committee, Cheshire
 Vernon Whitaker, Senior Technical Superintendent (Engineer), No. 10 Maintenance Unit, Royal Air Force, Hullavington
 John Thomas Wiggans, Station Master, Manchester (Victoria, Exchange and Salford), Railway Executive
 David Watkin Williams, Chief Executive Officer, Wales Region, Ministry of Fuel and Power
 Frank Williams, Vice-Chairman, Chesterfield and District Local Employment Committee
 George Richard Williams, Clerical Officer, Ministry of National Insurance
 Major Conrad Thomas Wilson, Branch Secretary, Officers' Association
 Esther Wilson, Honorary Assistant Secretary, Carlisle Savings Committee
 Frank Baxter Wilson, Technical Adviser, Guest, Keen and Nettlefolds (Midlands), Ltd., Darlaston
 Arthur Edgar John Wood, Higher Executive Officer, Ministry of Fuel and Power
 Dorothy Rose Wood, Assistant, Music Department, British Broadcasting Corporation
 Frederick George Wood, Headmaster, South Benfleet Primary School. For services during the recent floods in the Eastern Counties.
 Gwendolin Blanche Wood, lately County Officer, St. John Ambulance Brigade, Nottinghamshire
 Frank Cecil Woolcott, Senior Executive Officer, Office of H.M. Procurator General and Treasury Solicitor
 Leopold Adrian Worswick, Vice-Chairman, Barnstaple Local Employment Committee
 Charles Cowley Worters, Secretary, Hire Purchase Trade. Association
 Ernest Wright, Higher Executive Officer, Scottish Home Department
 Daniel Llewelyn Wynn, Slaughterhouse Agent, North Eastern Area, Ministry of Food

Diplomatic Service and Overseas List
 Syed Sager Ali, Accountant at Her Majesty's Embassy in Bangkok
 Harold Blood, Deputy Assistant Civil Secretary (Personnel), Sudan Government
 Ernest Thomas Castro, lately British Pro-Consul at Malaga
 John Christie, British subject resident in Uruguay
 Leslie Clarke, lately Temporary Assistant, Control Commission for Germany (British Element)
 Robert Arthur Clarke, Superintendent of Police, Tripoli, Western Province, Libya
 Charles Levinge Clayton  Travel Officer at Her Majesty's Consulate-General at New York
 Judith Mary Cotton, Personal Secretary to Her Majesty's Ambassador in Athens
 Norman Matthew Darbyshire, Attached to the British Middle East Office
 Walter Victor Deacock, Second Secretary at Her Majesty's Embassy in Paris
 Arthur George Dovey, British subject resident in Chile
 John Spenser Ritchie Duncan, Deputy Assistant Civil Secretary (Political), Sudan Government
 Edward George Dunckley, Executive Officer, Control Commission for Germany (British Element)
 Henry Fletcher Ellis, British subject lately resident in Egypt
 Jack Evans, Acting Director General of Forestry, Iraq Government
 Hector Ernest Floridia, British subject resident in Egypt
 Samuel Fullman, Senior Temporary Assistant, Information Services Division, Control Commission for Germany (British Element)
 Ada Louisa Gulliver, Medical Missionary of the Bible Churchmen's Missionary Society resident in Burma
 Jessie Harvey, British subject resident in Denmark
 Arthur Cyril Walter Hayday, lately Trade Officer, Department of Economics and Trade, Sudan Government
 Barbara Hayes, Head of the Speakers' Section, British Information Services, New York
 Margaret Kate Henry, Archivist at Her Majesty's Embassy in Santiago
 Arthur Jean Janssens, Her Majesty's Vice-Consul at Antwerp
 Miriam Jennings, British subject resident in the Argentine Republic
 Mannfield Blanche Johnston, Typist at Her Majesty's Embassy in Peking
 Albert Thomas Lamb  lately Third Secretary at Her Majesty's Legation in Bucharest
 Federigo Lelli, British Pro-Consul at Florence
 John Lumsden, Her Majesty's Vice-Consul at Casablanca
 The Reverend Father Michael Joseph Mceleney, lately Senior Roman Catholic Chaplain to the Control Commission for Germany (British Element)
 Elizabeth Susan Olive Parsons, lately Clerical Officer at Her Majesty's Embassy in Tehran
 Major Eric Pritchard, Superintendent of Prisons in Tripolitama, Libya
 Frederick Ricks, lately Inspector of Water Supply, Public Works Department, Sudan Government
 Lucy Hilda Rowcliffe, British subject resident in France
 Charles Bertram Longmore Ryland, General Manager of the Western Telegraph Company Limited, Porto Alegre
 Thomas Albert Frederick Savile Stamper, Secretary, Sudan Government Agency in London
 Onslow Joseph John Tuckley, Functional Officer, British Council, Egypt
 Kenneth Douglas Whitmarsh, Senior Temporary Assistant, Control Commission for Germany (British Element)

Colonies, Protectorates, etc
 George Patten Adams, of Westbury, State of Tasmania. For services to philanthropic and charitable movements.
 Isobel Mary Carter, Secretary of the Three Services Entertainment Committee in Calcutta, India
 Alexander Cave, Officer in Charge of the Fire Rescue Services attached to the Kolar Gold Field Mining Companies in Southern India
 Lionel Deary, General Secretary, Mine Workers' Union, Southern Rhodesia
 Frank Robert Dowse, Superintendent of Reserves, Launceston City Council, State of Tasmania
 Margaret Bryden Fearn. For services to women's welfare organisations in Umtali, Southern Rhodesia.
 George Dennis Augustine Fitzgerald, Honorary Treasurer, Karachi Branch. United Kingdom Association in Pakistan
 Kenneth Harold Greager, Chief Engineer, Central African Airways, Southern Rhodesia
 George Louis Harvey. For services to the United Kingdom community in Bangalore, India.
 Josie Herbst. For social welfare services in Fort Victoria, Southern Rhodesia.
 Rachel Hlazo. For social welfare services to the African women of Southern Rhodesia.
 Christine Barclay Hoole. For services to the Red Cross Society in Southern Rhodesia.
 Helen Louisa Hubbard. For services to the Memorable Order of Tin Hats Women's Association (Mothwas) in Southern Rhodesia
 Enid Frances Jones, Secretary of the Church of England Advisory Council of Empire Settlement
 Katherine Isabel Kewley, Matron of the Lady Victoria Buxton Girls' Club, State of South Australia
 Johanna Sophia Klopper, a school teacher in the Bechuanaland Protectorate
 Mary Evangelist Lamp, of Launceston, State of Tasmania. For social welfare services.
 Mary Julia Lawes. For services to the Red Cross in the State of South Australia.
 Raymond Bernhard Leonard. For services rendered under the auspices of the Bombay European Relief Association.
 Juliet Kathleen Maccaw. For services rendered in Calcutta under the auspices of the East India Charitable Trust.
 Mabel Gertrude MacGowan, Confidential Secretary to the Director-General, and the Chairman of the Central Council, of the Over-Seas League
 Catherine McLaren. For social welfare services to the United Kingdom community in Lahore and elsewhere in the Punjab.
 Philadelphia Margaret Noakes, Commissioner for Training, Girl Guides Association, Southern Rhodesia
 Ida Josephine Isabell Norton. For social welfare services, especially to the Royal Hobart Hospital, State of Tasmania
 Samuel Alexander Bernard Polglase, Chairman of the East Pakistan Branch of the United Kingdom Association m Pakistan
 The Reverend David Leslie Scott, Principal of Murray College, Sialkot, Pakistan
 Leslie Hart Stewart, Secretary, Natural Resources Board, Southern Rhodesia
 Albert Baden Thompson, a prominent Trade Unionist, and a member of the Board of Management of the State Bank, in the State of South Australia
 Henry John Ranger Tyrrell. For services to charitable organisations in Southern Rhodesia.
 Benjamin Watkins. For public and philanthropic services in the State of Tasmania.
 Cecil Hobart Webster. For services to patriotic and philanthropic organisations in the State of Tasmania.
 Ernest Kynaston Weeden. For services to the National Youth Council and the Holiday Association, Southern Rhodesia.

Colonial Service
 Albert Robert Allen, Emergency Administrative Officer (Resettlement Officer), Federation of Malaya
 James Robert Norton-Amor, Clerk to the Justices, Registrar of Births, Deaths and Marriages, Gibraltar
 Rupert Stanley Bastin, lately Chief Wireless Officer, Gilbert and Ellice Islands
 Henry Herbert Brazier, Chief Computer, Directorate of Colonial Surveys
 Frederick James Broadway. For public services in St. Helena.
 Dillet Hartman Burrows, Commissioner, Georgetown, Exuma, Bahamas
 Mona Eileen Byer. For services to the Girl Guide Movement in the Windward Islands
 Ruth Camplin. For nursing services in Uganda.
 Terence Ashton Dupont Clarke, Headmaster, Wesley Hall Junior School, Barbados
 The Reverend Erasmus William Benjamin Cole. For services to education in Sierra Leone.
 James Walter Collins, Water Superintendent, Public Works Department, Kenya
 Alfred Curmi, Executive Officer, Malta
 Wallestine Godwin Dako, Senior Collector of Customs and Excise, Gold Coast
 Victor Akintunde Davies, Accountant, Public Works Department, Nigeria
 Dorothy Delbridge  For medical services in Fiji.
 Patrick Joseph Dominique, Senior Agricultural Assistant, Trinidad
 Edward John Downes, Superintendent of Public Gardens, Jamaica
 Philippe Dupavillon, Manager and Secretary to the Tobacco Board, Mauritius
 Bessie Mary East. For services to education in Tanganyika.
 Claude Anthony Eber, Architect, Federation of Malaya
 Edwin Edgar Eusey. For public services in Belize, British Honduras.
 Doris Mary Evans, Queen Elizabeth's Colonial Nursing Service, Principal Matron, Nigeria
 Rosamond Arorunkah Fowlis, Domestic Science Organiser, Gambia
 Douglas Francis Fromings. For services to the Tobacco industry, Nyasaland
 Percy Richard Fuller, Establishment Officer, Northern Rhodesia
 William Peter Gaskell. For services to the Boy Scout Movement in Nigeria
 Leslie Francis Gill. For public services in the British Solomon Islands.
 Major Goh Guan Hop, E.D. For public services in the Federation of Malaya.
 Christoffel Goosen. For services to the Trade Union Movement in Northern Rhodesia
 Eleanora Minnie Hall, Queen Elizabeth's Colonial Nursing Service, Matron, Tanganyika
 Jessie Cameron Hallett. For public services and social work in Bermuda.
 James Martin Hallpike, Chief Sanitary Inspector, Antigua, Leeward Islands
 Keith Jefferson Henderson, Colonial Administrative Service, Secretary for Chinese Affairs, Penang, Federation of Malaya
 Major Sydney William Kenwood, Director of Music, British Guiana Militia Band
 Osmond John Ward-Horner, Postmaster, Seychelles
 Ramadan Jemil. For public services in Cyprus.
 Albert Jillott, Superintendent of Prisons, Hong Kong
 Edward Jones, Chief Inspector of Works, Nigeria
 William Bertram Arnold Joost Keppel, Operations Officer, Department of Civil Aviation, Nigeria
 Hubert Forrester Knowles, Superintendent, Bahamas General Hospital
 Ahmed Abdulrasul Mohamed Lakha Kanji. For public services in Zanzibar.
 Costas Charalambus Lap As, Inspector of Elementary Schools (Greek), Cyprus
 James Wilfred Leach, Colonial Administrative Service, Assistant District Officer, Nigeria
 Leung Fung Ki, Education Officer, Hong Kong
 Li Chik-Nung, Assistant Social Welfare Officer, Hong Kong
 Kenneth Denham Lloyd, Education Officer, Somaliland
 Edward Jackson McCormack, Assistant Master and Registrar, Supreme Court, Sierra Leone
 Joseph Darnley Maloney, Administrative Officer and Magistrate, Anguilla, Leeward Islands
 Lieutenant-Colonel Ernest Marston. For public services in Kenya.
 Clare Elizabeth Lumsden Milne, Headmistress, Government English Preparatory School, Muar, Federation of Malaya
 Clarence Michael Miranda, Telephone Engineer, Posts and Telephones Department, Aden
 Albert Edward Monteiro, Chief Clerk, Chief Accountant's Department, Singapore Harbour Board
 Marjorie Helen Murray. For services to education in Kenya
 James Stevenson Nelson, Establishment Officer, East African Posts and Telecommunications Administration
 Ambrose Michael Ofafa. For public services in Kenya.
 Alfred Olajide, Assistant Secretary, Nigeria
 Henry Arthur Oliver, Colonial Administrative Service. Administrative Officer. Gambia
 Anthony Pape. For public services in Kenya.
 Chaturbhai Khushalbhai Patel. For public and welfare services in Tanganyika.
 William Oliver Petrie  Colonial Medical Service, Medical Officer, Nyasaland
 William Durham Petty, Fire Chief, Hamilton Volunteer Fire Brigade, Bermuda
 Albert Russell Games Prosser, Assistant Director (Mass Education and Community Development), Gold Coast
 Sanmugan Ramalingam, lately Technical Assistant, Survey Department, Singapore
 Ramjuttan Ramdass, Assistant Commissioner of Income Tax, Mauritius
 Christina Agnes Séguin. For services to education in Northern Rhodesia.
 Joseph Kenneth Shepherd, Superintendent, Buildings, Prisons Department, Uganda
 Soo Hoy Mun  Honorary Medical Officer, Chinese Maternity Hospital, Federation of Malaya
 Arthur Dudley Soutar  Principal Assistant Secretary, Secretariat, Jamaica
 Annette Irene Greer Spence, Colonial Education Service, Education Officer, Nigeria
 Myra Annie Elizabeth-Spurr. For services to education in Uganda.
 Charles Payne Sutcliffe, Colonial Police Service, Assistant Superintendent of Police, Tanganyika
 Datu Abang Abu Talip-bin Datu Abang Haji Buassan. For public services in Sarawak.
 William Richardson Tatem  For public services in the Turks and Caicos Islands.
 Eileen Urich. For social welfare work in Trinidad.
 Elizabeth Affuah Vanderpuye, Health Officer, Red Cross Society, Gold Coast
 John Voon Yin Kui, lately Chief Clerk, Resident's Office, Jesselton, North Borneo
 Vythilingam Sithambaram V'Thaver, lately Financial Assistant, Medical Headquarters, Penang, Federation of Malaya
 Claude Hamilton Walcott, Harbourmaster, British Guiana
 Florence Mary Walker. For services to education in Nyasaland.
 Wallace Wynter Warden  For public services in Fiji.
 Ernest Philip Wharton, Deputy Inspector of Stores, Office of the Crown Agents for the Colonies
 Herbert Whittaker, Assistant Engineer, Civil Engineering Department, Office of the Crown Agents for the Colonies
 Dunstan Matthew William, Telegraph Inspector, North Borneo
 Vincent Bpwen Williams. For social services in Barbados.
 Gerald Hugh Wilson, Director, Northern Rhodesia and Nyasaland Publications Bureau
 Leonie Mary Wright. For public and social services in British Honduras.
 Felix Durocher-Yvon, lately Director of Agriculture, Seychelles, now Agricultural Officer, Northern Rhodesia
 Haji Zahwi Bin Haji Musa, Headman in Mukah and Chairman, Mixed Local Authority, Sarawak
 Elias Zammit. For public services in Malta.

Honorary Members
 Seiyid Umar Al Mihdhar Bin Alawi Al Kaf. For public services in the Aden Protectorate.
 Thong Jin Hin. For public services in the Federation of Malaya.
 Dato Kamaruddin Bin Haji Ibrahim, Territorial Chief, Ulu Selangor, Federation of Malaya
 Mohamed Yusoff Bin Ahmad. For public services in the Federation of Malaya.
 Abdul Majid Bin Haji Mohamed Shahid, Assistant Conservator of Forests, Federation of Malaya
 Ahmadu, Emir of Misau, Nigeria
 The Reverend Amos Sodunola Solarin. For social and welfare services in Nigeria.
 Jacob Maduegbunam Onyechi, Assistant Secretary (Finance), Nigeria
 Effiong Etim Ekeng, Health Superintendent, Nigeria
 Ignatius Alexander Arudimma Idigbe, Administrative Assistant, Nigeria
 Chief Henry Ekpo Enyenihi, Chairman, Eket County Council, Nigeria
 Michael Eledumo Ojomo, Senior Registrar, Supreme Court of Nigeria
 Afotanju Ogedegbe, lately Auditor, Nigeria
 James Theophilus Ayodele Dixon, Assistant Superintendent of Police, Nigeria
 Bai Koblo, Paramount Chief, Marampa, Sierra Leone
 Mohamoud Ali Shirreh, Senior Akil of the Warsangeli tribe, Somaliland
 Haji Bahanan Hersi. For services to the Local Government in Somaliland.
 Besweri Kisalita Mulyanti, lately Saza Chief of Kyaggwe, Uganda
 Alexander Kironde, Saza Chief of Buddu County, Uganda
 Zefania Nabikamba, County Chief, Bugabula, Busoga, Uganda
 Matayo Lamot, Lawirwodi, Uganda
 Yovani Kiwanuka, Clerk of Works, Kigezi African Local Government, Uganda

Order of the Companions of Honour (CH) 
 Edward Benjamin Britten, Composer
 The Right Honourable James Chuter Ede , Labour Member of Parliament for Mitcham, 1923, and for South Shields, 1929–31 and since 1935. Secretary of State for the Home Department, 1945–51; Leader of the House of Commons, March–October 1951. For political and public services.
 Lieutenant-Colonel Sir (William Jocelyn) Ian Fraser , Unionist Member of Parliament for Morecambe and Lonsdale since 1950; for Lonsdale, 1940–50 ; and for North St. Pancras, 1924–29 and 1931–36. Chairman, Executive Council of St. Dunstan's since 1921. National President of British Legion since 1947. For political and public services.
 The Right Honourable Thomas Johnston. For public services in Scotland.

Royal Victorian Medals

Silver 
 Richard Clement Allenby
 Percival Frank Ash
 George Henry Bignell
 Robert Bissett
 Charles Henry Brown
 Leopold Isaac Noah Brown
 Alfred James Cole
 Thomas Fraser
 Edward Victor Greener
 Stanley Edgar Hooks
 Stanley William Lionel Rivers Lucking
 Ernest George Moffat
 Jessie Wilson Massie Robertson
 William Robson
 Joseph Charles Shefford
 Sidney Albert Spong
 Edwin Stuart
 William Urquhart
 Inspector Ronald Douglas Wells, Metropolitan Police
 Beatrice Anne Williams

Queen's Commendations for Valuable Service in the Air 
 Captain Richard Rymer, Training Captain, Viscount Flight, British European Airways
 Acting Group Captain Richard Irvin Knight Edwards  Royal Air Force
 Wing Commander John Barraclough  Royal Air Force
 Squadron Leader Derek Clare  Royal Air Force
 Squadron Leader Harold Cecil Flemons, Royal Air Force
 Squadron Leader Stanley Richard Hodge, Royal Air Force
 Squadron Leader Henry William Lamond, Royal Air Force
 Squadron Leader Alastair Cavendish Lindsay Mackie  Royal Air Force
 Squadron Leader William John McLean  Royal Air Force
 Squadron Leader Philip Richard Robinson, Royal Air Force
 Acting Squadron Leader Kenneth Barnes, Royal Air Force
 Acting Squadron Leader Robert Anthony Carson  Royal Air Force
 Flight Lieutenant Barry Nigel Byrne, Royal Air Force
 Flight Lieutenant Arthur Frederick Carvosso, Royal Air Force
 Flight Lieutenant James Leslie Stuart Crawford, Royal Air Force
 Flight Lieutenant William Snowdon Douglas, Royal Air Force
 Flight Lieutenant William Edwards, Royal Air Force
 Flight Lieutenant John Horrobin Elliott, Royal Air Force
 Flight Lieutenant Thomas Philip Fargher  Royal Air Force
 Flight Lieutenant Mane Feldman, Royal Air Force
 Flight Lieutenant Ernest Derek Glaser  Royal Air Force
 Flight Lieutenant Caryl Ramsay Gordon, Royal Air Force
 Flight Lieutenant James Nicoll Gracie, Royal Air Force
 Flight Lieutenant Robert McConnell Hamilton, Royal Air Force
 Flight Lieutenant Robert Herrick, Royal Air Force (Deceased)
 Flight Lieutenant Paul Albert Hunt, Royal Air Force
 Flight Lieutenant Ian Richard Iddison, Royal Air Force
 Flight Lieutenant Justin Michael McCann, Royal Air Force
 Flight Lieutenant Thomas Walter Monaghan, Royal Air Force
 Flight Lieutenant Horatio Ogilvie, Royal Air Force Reserve of Officers
 Flight Lieutenant James Ernest Petty, Royal Air Force
 Flight Lieutenant Eric Phillips  Royal Air Force
 Flight Lieutenant Wladyslaw Jan Potocki  Royal Air Force
 Flight Lieutenant Rex David Roe, Royal Air Force
 Flight Lieutenant Kenneth William Rogers, Royal Air Force
 Flight Lieutenant David Rankin Scott  Royal Air Force
 Flight Lieutenant Denis John Thomas Sharp  Royal Air Force
 Flight Lieutenant Jack Alan Shelley, Royal Air Force
 Flight Lieutenant John Stephen, Royal Air Force
 Flight Lieutenant William Notman Trimble, Royal Air Force
 Flight Lieutenant Frederick John Wheeler  Royal Air Force
 Flying Officer John Bruce, Royal Air Force
 Flying Officer Bedrich Froehlich, Royal Air Force
 Master Engineer Eric Russell Mears, Royal Air Force
 Master Engineer Master Signaller Raymond Edward Drake, Royal Air Force
 Flight Sergeant Ian Robertson Craig, Royal Air Force
 Flight Sergeant Hugh Edward Henry Wood, Royal Air Force
 Sergeant Raymond Arthur Barnes, Royal Air Force
 Sergeant Christopher David Humphreys, Royal Air Force
 Sergeant Ronald Sidney Jackson, Royal Air Force
 Sergeant Harry Watt Mackenzie, Royal Air Force

Royal Red Crosses

First Class (RRC) 
 Kathleen Violet Chapman  Principal Matron, Queen Alexandra's Royal Naval Nursing Service
 Major Nancy Hope Hodgman, Queen Alexandra's Royal Army Nursing Corps
 Major Edith Adrienne Horrocks, Queen Alexandra's Royal Army Nursing Corps
 Wing Officer Emily Martha Marfleet  Princess Mary's Royal Air Force Nursing Service

Second Class (ARRC) 
 Marjorie Smith, Senior Nursing Sister, Queen Alexandra's Royal Naval Nursing Service
 Margaret Gallagher Bonar, Supervising V.A.D. Nursing Member
 Major Ruth Constance Davis, Queen Alexandra's Royal Army Nursing Corps
 Major Carrie Trahair De Rouffignac, Queen Alexandra's Royal Army Nursing Corps
 Major Eva Thorpe, Queen Alexandra's Royal Army Nursing Corps
 Flight Officer Olwen Cecilia Rees, Princess Mary's Royal Air Force Nursing Service
 Flight Officer Annie Laura Greenwell Robertson, Princess Mary's Royal Air Force Nursing Service

Air Force Crosses (AFC) 
 Wing Commander George Hubert Newbourne Shiells  Royal Australian Air Force
 Acting Wing Commander Konrad Bazarnik  Royal Air Force
 Squadron Leader John Hanbury Smith-Carington, Royal Air Force
 Squadron Leader Lionel Harwood Casson  Royal Auxiliary Air Force
 Squadron Leader Henry Moresby Chinnery, Royal Air Force
 Squadron Leader Ernest Leonard David Drake  Royal Air Force
 Squadron Leader Terence Helper  Royal Air Force
 Squadron Leader Donald Ridgewell Howard  Royal Air Force
 Squadron Leader Denis Seymour Leete, Royal Air Force
 Squadron Leader Sidney James Perkins, Royal Air Force
 Squadron Leader Dunham Hodgson Seaton  Royal Air Force
 Acting Squadron Leader James Leslie Barlow, Royal Air Force
 Acting Squadron Leader Frederick Clark Barter, Royal Air-Force
 Acting Squadron Leader John Gascon Claridge  Royal Air Force
 Acting Squadron Leader David John Fowler, Royal Air Force
 Acting Squadron Leader Clifford Laurence Godwin, Royal Air Force
 Acting Squadron Leader John Miller  Royal Air Force
 Acting Squadron Leader Anthony Archibald Smafles, Royal Air Force
 Acting Squadron Leader Leslie Morris Whittington, Royal Air Force
 Flight Lieutenant Brian Spencer Adlington, Royal Air Force
 Flight Lieutenant George Brooks Bell, Royal Air Force
 Flight Lieutenant John Beaumont Blackett, Royal Air Force
 Flight Lieutenant John Anthony Brown, Royal Air Force
 Flight Lieutenant Roland Louis Ernest Burton, Royal Air Force
 Flight Lieutenant Ronald Desmond Campbell  Royal Air Force
 Flight Lieutenant Josef Hugo Cermak, Royal Air Force
 Flight Lieutenant Peter George Coulson, Royal Air Force
 Flight Lieutenant Henry Silvester Horth, Royal Air Force
 Flight Lieutenant Thomas Lawrie Kennedy, Royal Air Force
 Flight Lieutenant David Langford, Royal Air Force
 Flight Lieutenant John Gilbert Matthews, Royal Air Force
 Flight Lieutenant Charles John Morgan, Royal Air Force
 Flight Lieutenant Jaroslav Muzika, Royal Air Force
 Flight Lieutenant Kendall Cecil Douglas Nixon, Royal Air Force
 Flight Lieutenant Trevor Winston Oakey, Royal Air Force
 Flight Lieutenant John Stanley Owen,.Royal Air Force
 Flight Lieutenant John Douglas Price, Royal Air Force
 Flight Lieutenant Keith Bernard Rogers  Royal Air Force
 Flight Lieutenant Maldwyn Roy Sisley, Royal Air Force
 Flight Lieutenant Michael Clement Nevil Smart, Royal Air Force
 Flight Lieutenant Charles Michael Stavert, Royal Air Force
 Flight Lieutenant George Stephenson  Royal Air Force
 Flight Lieutenant Charles Donald Thieme, Royal Air Force
 Flight Lieutenant Anthony Philip Trowbridge, Royal Air Force
 Flight Lieutenant Geoffrey Victor Wadams, Royal Air Force
 Flight Lieutenant Kelly Aerial Whynacht  Royal Air Force
 Flight Lieutenant John Robert Wilcock, Royal Air Force
 Flight Lieutenant Richard Thomas Glyndwr Williams, Royal Auxiliary Air Force
 Flight Lieutenant David Wright, Royal Air Force
 Flying Officer Ivan Cardwell, Royal Air Force
 Flying Officer Maurice Arthur Joseph St. Pierre, Royal Air Force
 Flying Officer Jindrich Petr Skirka, Royal Air Force
 Master Pilot George Henry Owen, A.F.M Royal Air Force
 Lieutenant Commander Cecil Ernest Price, Royal Navy
 Lieutenant Frank Cawood, Royal Navy
 Lieutenant Thomas Guy Innes, Royal Navy
 Lieutenant Robert Wooton Jaggard, Royal Navy

Awarded a Bar to the Air Force Cross (AFC*) 
 Squadron Leader Jim Lomas  Royal Air Force
 Squadron Leader Leslie George Press  Royal Air Force
 Flight Lieutenant Neil Currie Thorne  Royal Air Force

Air Force Medals (AFM) 
 Flight Sergeant Benjamin Roy Bradley, Royal Air Force
 Flight Sergeant James Dougan, Royal Air Force
 Flight Sergeant Alfred John Fairbairn, Royal Air Force
 Flight Sergeant Alistair Bruce Fraser, Royal Air Force
 Flight Sergeant Kazimierz Gorny, Royal Air Force
 Flight Sergeant Terence Maxwell Hamer, Royal Air Force
 Flight Sergeant (now Master Signaller) William Frederick Joseph Hills, Royal Air Force
 Flight Sergeant Austen Brian Howes, Royal Air Force
 Flight Sergeant Thomas McHugh  Royal Air Force
 Flight Sergeant Alexander Henry Shelton, Royal Air Force
 Flight Sergeant Henry Frederick John Thorpe, Royal Air Force
 Sergeant Zivan Atanackovig, Royal Air Force
 Sergeant Richard Eric Bowler, Royal Air Force
 Sergeant Geoffrey Ashwell Hall, Royal Air Force
 Sergeant William Sidney Jones, Royal Air Force
 Sergeant John Patrick McCarthy, Royal Air Force
 Sergeant Daniel Victor Sutton, Royal Air Force
 Sergeant Richard Thomas Vane, Royal Air Force

British Empire Medals (BEM)

Military Division 
 Sergeant (acting) Isabella Galder Arbuthnot, Women's Royal Army Corps
 Sergeant Thomas Albert Ash, Corps of Royal Electrical and Mechanical Engineers, Territorial Army
 Staff-Sergeant (acting) William Baxter, Corps of Royal Electrical and Mechanical Engineers
 Staff-Sergeant Harold Edward Berry, Royal Army Service Corps
 Warrant Officer Class II (acting) Dorothy Mary Bisson, Women's Royal Army Corps
 Colour Sergeant (acting) John Arthur Charles Britnell, The Royal Berkshire Regiment (Princess Charlotte of Wales's)
 Staff-Sergeant Malcolm Burns, Corps of Royal Electrical and Mechanical Engineers, Territorial Army
 Warrant Officer Class I (acting) George Leonard Walter Carrington, Corps of Royal Electrical and Mechanical Engineers
 Staff-Sergeant (acting) George Henry Smith-Carter, Corps of Royal Engineers
 Sergeant Edward Thomas Chapman  The Monmouthshire Regiment, Territorial Army
 Sergeant Thomas Henry Chapman, Corps of Royal Engineers
 Warrant Officer Class II (acting) (Artillery Clerk) Thomas Victor Childs, Royal Regiment of Artillery
 Warrant Officer Class II (acting) Daniel Comrie, The Argyll and Sutherland Highlanders (Princess Louise's)
 Sergeant Edwin Cookey, The Nigeria Regiment, Royal West African Frontier Force
 Staff-Sergeant (acting) Steven Frederick Cotterill, Corps of Royal Electrical and Mechanical Engineers
 Sergeant Walter Albert Dawkins, Army Catering Corps
 Warrant Officer Class II (acting) John Densham, Corps of Royal Engineers
 Warrant Officer Class I (acting) William Edward Dimond, Corps of Royal Military Police
 Sergeant Frederick Alfred Dodd, Corps of Royal Military Police
 Warrant Officer Class II (acting) Reginald Percival Fisher, Royal Regiment of Artillery
 Regimental Sergeant-Major Araba Fulani, The Gold Coast Regiment, Royal West African Frontier Force
 Charles Sidney Gayler, Corps of Royal Electrical and Mechanical Engineers
 Colour-Sergeant Robert Gibson, Scats Guards
 Staff-Sergeant Anthony Bruce Gillmore, Corps of Royal Military Police
 Sergeant Alan George Harfield, Royal Corps of Signals
 Corporal Audrey Alice Harris, Women's Royal Army Corps, Territorial Army
 Sergeant Ernest Harris, London Irish Rifles, Royal Ulster Rifles, Territorial Army
 Battery Quartermaster-Sergeant Albert Herbert, Royal Regiment of Artillery, Territorial Army
 Warrant Officer Class II (acting) (now Substantive) Douglas Lloyd Hill, Royal Army Ordnance Corps
 Sergeant William Hopkinson, Royal Regiment of Artillery, Territorial Army
 Warrant Officer Class II (acting) (now Substantive) James Thomas Hutson  Royal Army Ordnance Corps
 Sergeant James Hyndman, 8th King's Royal Irish Hussars, Royal Armoured Corps
 Regimental Sergeant-Major Ali Kanjarga, The Gold Coast Regiment, Royal West African Frontier Force
 Staff-Sergeant (acting) Jack Keighley, Royal Army Service Corps
 Sergeant George Edward Kirk, The South Staffordshire Regiment, Territorial Army
 Sergeant (acting) William Knights, Army Catering Corps
 Staff-Sergeant (Instructor) William Francis Lane, Army Physical Training Corps
 Staff-Sergeant (acting) Alfred Gordon Littlewood, Royal Army Pay Corps
 Warrant Officer Class II (acting) William MacDonald, Royal Army Service Corps
 Battery Sergeant-Major Ngomoli Malombe, East Africa Artillery
 Lance-Corporal (acting) Alfred William Marshall, Royal Army Service Corps
 Warrant Officer Class II (acting) (now Substantive) Robert Sydney Martin, Royal Regiment of Artillery
 Sergeant Charles Edward Meacham, Corps of Royal Engineers
 Sergeant (acting) Samuel Alfred Moore, Royal Regiment of Artillery
 Sergeant William Thomas Morris, Army Catering Corps
 Sergeant William Moses, The Border Regiment
 Sergeant (Artillery Clerk) Norman Pass, Royal Regiment of Artillery
 Staff-Sergeant (acting) Reginald Frederick Patten, Royal Army Pay Corps
 Staff-Sergeant (now Warrant Officer Class II) (Artillery Clerk) Joseph Edward Pearson, Royal Regiment of Artillery
 Warrant Officer Class II (acting) David Radin, The Seaforth Highlanders (Ross-shire Buffs, The Duke of Albany's)
 Sergeant Walter Rathbone, The Royal Welch Fusiliers, Territorial Army
 Warrant Officer Class II (acting) Edward Robeson Rodger, Royal Army Medical Corps, Territorial Army
 Sergeant Dennis Harold Rose, Royal Army Service Corps
 Warrant Officer Class II (acting) John Russell, Royal Army Medical Corps
 Staff-Sergeant Johnson Scott, Royal Army Medical Corps, Territorial Army
 Warrant Office Class II (acting) George Everard Slater, The King's Royal Rifle Corps, formerly attached The Kenya Regiment, Territorial Army
 Corporal (acting) Linnette Adelie Small, Women's Royal Army Corps
 Sergeant James Alfred Smith, North Irish Horse, Royal Armoured Corps, Territorial Army
 Staff-Sergeant Marguerite Sylvia Smith, Women's Royal Army Corps
 Staff-Sergeant (Artillery Clerk) James Neil Tierney, Royal Regiment of Artillery, Territorial Army
 Warrant Officer Class II (acting) George Frederick Trodd, The Dorset Regiment
 Colour-Sergeant John Voce, The Queen's Own Cameron Highlanders, Territorial Army
 Staff-Sergeant George John William Walter, Royal Army Service Corps
 Sergeant (Bugle Major) Harold Ewart Wiltshire, The Somerset Light Infantry (Prince Albert's), Territorial Army
 Sergeant Alfred George Young, Royal Corps of Signals.
 Flight Sergeant John Dennis, Royal Air Force
 Flight Sergeant William Lockwood Gardner, Royal Air Force
 Flight Sergeant Geoffrey Fairweather Hankinson, Royal Air Force
 Flight Sergeant Ronald Heather, Royal Air Force
 Flight Sergeant Thomas Arthur William Kinzett, Royal Air Force
 Flight Sergeant William Frederick Lane, Royal Air Force
 Flight Sergeant Leonard Mallinson, Royal Air Force
 Flight Sergeant Joseph O'Rourke, Royal Air Force
 Flight Sergeant Ronald Palin, Royal Auxiliary Air Force
 Flight Sergeant Robert Richard Livesy Peers, Royal Air Force
 Flight. Sergeant Frederick Norman Ratliff, Royal Air Force
 Flight Sergeant David William Sarbutt, Royal Air Force
 Flight Sergeant Henry Schofield, Royal Air Force
 Flight Sergeant Andrew Cooper Scott, Royal Air Force
 Flight Sergeant Leslie Frank Vanderson, Royal Air Force
 Flight Sergeant Isaac Christmas Webb, Royal Air Force
 Flight Sergeant Henry William Wright, Royal Air Force
 Flight Sergeant Leslie Gordon Young, Royal Air Force
 Acting Flight Sergeant Graham Briggs, Royal Air Force
 Acting Flight Sergeant Leonard James Cross, Royal Air Force
 Acting Flight Sergeant Laura Elizabeth Lee, Women's Royal Air Force
 Acting Flight Sergeant John William Warren, Royal Air Force
 Sergeant Frederick William Brie Day, Royal Auxiliary Air Force
 Sergeant Alfred Samuel Huggett, Royal Air Force
 Sergeant Walter Lippiatt, Royal Air Force
 Sergeant Gilbert Noel Lipscomb, Royal Air Force
 Sergeant Duncan Reid Macintosh, Royal Air Force
 Sergeant Frank Albert Monks, Royal Air Force
 Sergeant Albert Edward Nash, Royal Air Force
 Sergeant Frank Todman Spencer, Royal Air Force
 Acting Sergeant Frederick Braggs, Royal Air Force
 Acting Sergeant Leonard Jenkins, Royal Air Force
 Acting Sergeant Arthur Francis Gabriel Phillips, Royal Air Force
 Acting Sergeant Wilfred Edmond Thompson, Royal Air Force
 Chief Technician Donald Thompson, Royal Air Force
 Corporal Frederick Bennett, Royal Air Force
 Corporal Philip George Bowerman, Royal Air Force
 Corporal Eric Chatt, Royal Air Force
 Corporal Arthur Swail, Royal Air Force
 Acting Corporal Keith Ashmore, Royal Air Force
 Senior Aircraftman Clive Alfred Bates, Royal Air Force
 Senior Aircraftman John Francis Smith-Woodward, Royal Air Force
 Chief Petty Officer Telegraphist John George Adamson
 Chief Petty Officer Cook (O) Salvatore Agius
 Radio Electrician (Air) Geoffrey George Barker
 Chief Petty Officer Writer Richard William Beamish
 Regimental Sergeant Major Leslie John Boote, Royal Marines
 Ordnance Artificer 1st Class William Brown
 Quartermaster Sergeant Albert James Brunsdon, Royal Marines
 Chief Petty Officer Joseph Chircop
 Chief Petty Officer Stoker Mechanic Leonard Reginald Christopher
 Chief Petty Officer Walter Samuel Clements
 Petty Officer Harold Robert Cook
 Chief Petty Officer William George Cosens
 Aircrewman I Sidney Craig
 Petty Officer Wren Steward (G) Nellie Crawford, Women's Royal Naval Service
 Radio Electrician (Air) Herbert Crossley
 Sick Berth Chief Petty Officer Alfred Thomas Davies
 Chief Petty Officer Alfred Jeffrey Dobson
 Quartermaster Sergeant Frederick Farrar, Royal Marines
 Chief Petty Officer Stoker Mechanic Henry Charles Fletcher
 Mechanician 1st Class Loder Offord Alfred Forsdyke
 Chief Electrician Bethuel Henry Griffiths
 Chief Engine Room Artificer Frank Ernest Vincent Harris
 Chief Yeoman of Signals Charles Dennis Hollett
 Chief Engine Room Artificer Frank Howells
 Petty Officer Wren Irene Ivy Jeffery, Women's Royal Naval Service
 Quartermaster Sergeant William George Jenkins, Royal Marines
 Leading Seaman Frederick James Johnson
 Chief Electrician Henry James Justice 
 Colour Sergeant Herbert Roy Kent, Royal Marines
 Master-at-Arms William Terence Littleford
 Stores Chief Petty Officer (V) Frederick George Albert Lloyd
 Chief Engine Room Artificer Albert Douglas Mcmillan
 Chief Wren Jean Love Maltman, Women's Royal Naval Service
 Chief Petty Officer Writer Archibald William Charles Parfitt
 Chief Petty Officer George Dobson Procter 
 Chief Petty Officer William Thomas Randall
 Chief Airman Fitter (A) Keith Walter Bancroft Robertson
 Chief Radio Electrician (Air) George Henry Routleff
 Sick Berth Chief Petty Officer Abdul Ghani Bin Mohamed Sheriff, Royal Malayan Naval Volunteer Reserve
 Chief Petty Officer Albert Victor Smith
 Colour Sergeant James Taggert, Royal Marines
 Chief Engine Room Artificer Albert Henry Charles Taylor
 Master-at-Arms Alfred George Rex Tucker
 Chief Engine Room Artificer John Charles Warham 
 Sick Berth Attendant Donald Wilson

Civil Division 

United Kingdom
 Alfred John Abbott, Foreman, Rotax Ltd. (South Harrow, Middlesex)
 Arthur Adkins, General Yard Foreman, Litchurch Gasworks, East Midlands Gas Board (Derby)
 Elizabeth Allard, Commandant, Jay-wick Detachment, British Red Cross Society (Clacton-on-Sea, Essex). For services during the recent floods in the Eastern Counties.
 Thomas Edward Allen, Working Burner and Machine Caulker, Vickers-Armstrongs, Ltd., Walker-on-Tyne (Wallsend-on-Tyne)
 Herbert James Emmanuel Andrews, Electrician, Littlebrook Power Station, British Electricity Authority, South Eastern Division (Dartford, Kent). For services during the recent floods in the Eastern Counties.
 Lilian Mary Armstrong, Senior Chief Supervisor, Birmingham Trunk and Toll Exchange (Tipton, Staffordshire)
 William Ashford, Site Foreman, Steel Scaffolding Company Ltd. (Worcester Park, Surrey)
 Stanley Victor Attewell, Temporary Technical Assistant, Ministry of Works (Bradmore, Nottingham). For services during the recent floods in the Eastern Counties.
 Victoria May Babbs, Canteen Supervisor, Tyrell Heath Primary School (Grays, Essex). For services during the recent floods in the Eastern Counties.
 Howard Bacon, Deputy, Teversal Colliery, East Midlands Division, National Coal, Board (Sutton-in-Ashfield)
 Arthur Baker, Underground Repairer, Birch Coppice Colliery, West Midlands Division1; National Coal Board (Atherstone, Warwickshire)
 Henry James Baker, Resident Plumber Turn-cock, H.M. Dockyard, Sheerness, For services during the recent floods in the Eastern Counties.
 William Baker, Craftsman, Wallace Collection (Clapham Common, S.W.ll)
 Frederick Thomas Balderstone, Civil Defence Instructor, Purfleet, Essex, For services during the recent floods in the Eastern Counties.
 Alfred Ball, Electrical Section Leader, Saunders-Roe Ltd., Cowes
 Eileen Christine Bannerman; Commandant, Roxburgh No. 12 Detachment, British Red Cross Society
 Helen Edna Barbour, Manageress, N.A.A.F.I., Felixstowe (Leicester). For services during the recent floods' in the Eastern Counties.
 Andrew Barker, Senior Assistant (Scientific), Chemical Defence Experimental Establishment, Ministry of Supply (Salisbury)
 Frederick Stephen Barnes, Craftsman Sheet Metal Worker, Department of Chief Mechanical Engineer (Road Services), London Transport Executive (Harrow, Middlesex)
 Bertha Bauer, Assistant Supervisor (Telegraphs), Wealdstone Branch Post Office, Harrow, Middlesex
 Maria Beauchamp (Sister Maria Edith), Superintendent, Les Cotils Nursing Hostel for Old People, Guernsey
 Albert William Beazley, Clerk of Works, Great Ouse River Board (Downham Market, Norfolk). For services during the recent floods in the Eastern Counties.
 Jean Margaret Belding, Firewoman, Norfolk Fire Service, King's Lynn (Terrington St. Clement, Norfolk). For services during the recent floods in the Eastern Counties.
 John Bell  Checkweighman, Randolph and Gordon House Colliery, Durham Division, National Coal Board (Bishop Auckland)
 Frederick Arthur Gale Bentley, Foreman, Ministry of Works (Rawreth, Essex)
 Frederick Dennis Berry, Overseer, Padding-ton District Post Office (Upper Edmonton, N.18)
 Robert William Spears Bigg, Leading Architectural Assistant, War Office, Salisbury Plain (Amesbury, Wiltshire)
 Kenneth John Bird, Honorary Collector, Street Savings Group, South Baling, W.5
 Evelyn Bisley, Centre Organiser, Women's Voluntary Services, Queensborough (Minster, Kent). For services during the recent floods in the Eastern Counties.
 Stanley John Bissell, Inspector, Metropolitan Police Force (Westminster, S.W.I)
 John Blakey, Stores Class Grade II, Ministry of Supply (Thorp Arch, Yorkshire)
 Louis Gerald Blanc, Mechanic Examiner, Directorate of Inspection of Electrical and Mechanical Equipment, Ministry of Supply (Erith, Kent)
 Thomas George Bland, Timekeeper, John Mowlem & Company Ltd. (Palmers Green, N.13)
 Frederick William Bliss, Deputy Head Foreman, Hull and East Yorkshire River Board (Hull). For services during the recent floods in the Eastern Counties.
 Charles Redfern Bond, Head Chancery Messenger, H.M. Embassy, Cairo
 Bertie Leon Bowden, Divisional Superintendent, St. John Ambulance Brigade, Harwich, For services during the recent floods in the Eastern Counties.
 Harold Bowling, Constable, North Riding of Yorkshire Constabulary (Whitby). For services during the recent floods in the Eastern Counties.
 William Thomas Boxall, Farm Worker, North Mundham, Chichester
 Frank Bradbury, Foreman, North Eastern Electricity Board (Newcastle upon Tyne)
 John Brazington, Inspector of Park-keepers, Ministry of Works (Hyde Park, W.I.)
 George Albert Brett, Leading Engine Room Hand, S.S. Andes, Royal Mail Lines, Ltd., (Southampton)
 William Henry Brickwood, Foreman of Laboratory, R.N. Armament Depot, Priddy's Hard (Gosport)
 Ronald Frank Brooks, Chief Petty Officer Instructor, Holyhead Unit, Sea Cadet Corps
 Walter Brooks, Shop Foreman, Belvedere, Kent, For services during the recent floods in the Eastern Counties.
 George Brown, lately Assistant Foreman Gas Fitter, North Thames Gas Board (Tilbury)
 Herbert Sidney Stephen Brown, Technical Officer, Ministry of Labour and National Service (Southgate, N.14)
 James Charles Frederick Brown, Chief Inspector, Kent County Constabulary (Maid-stone, Kent). For services during the recent floods in the Eastern Counties.
 John R. Brown, Construction Foreman, South West Scotland Division, British Electricity Authority (Glasgow)
 Matthew Brown, Leading Capstanman, Queen's Dock, Clyde Navigation Trust (Glasgow)
 Thomas Richard Brown, Underground Repairer, Barnsley Main Colliery, North Eastern Division, National Coal Board (Barnsley)
 William Henry Brown, Foreman Toolmaker, Ernest Stevens Ltd. (Cradley Heath)
 Charles Bruce, Member, Coast Life Saving Corps, Balta Sound, Shetland
 Walter Bruce, Goods Guard, Eastern Region, Railway Executive (King's Lynn, Norfolk). For services during the recent floods in the Eastern Counties.
 Albert Burdon, Chargehand, Sigmund Pumps Ltd., Gateshead-on-Tyne (Dunston, Co. Durham)
 Andrew Cameron Burnett, Manager, Lord Roberts Workshops, Belfast
 Norman Richmond Cail, Station Master, Bedlington, Railway Executive, North Eastern Region
 William Campbell, Laboratory Mechanic, R.N. Torpedo Experimental Establishment (Greenock, Renfrewshire)
 William Nyren Card, Senior Supplies Superintendent, General Post Office (Crofton Park, S.E.4)
 Emily Cass, Centre Organiser, Driffield, Women's Voluntary Services
 Harry Catlow, Chief Loom Inspector, British Northrop Loom Company Ltd., Blackburn
 Lena Madeline Chaplin, Manageress, N.A.A.F.I., Grays (Braintree, Essex). For services during the recent floods in the Eastern Counties.
 Po Cheng, Chargehand, War Office, Hong Kong
 John Frederick Cocker, Temporary Storekeeper, Grade III, Ordnance Survey Department (Southampton)
 Elsie Cocking, Centre Organiser, downe Rural District, Derbyshire, Women's Voluntary Services (Creswell)
 Frank Basil Coker, Honorary Collector, Street Savings Group, Hove
 Percy Samuel Colleypriest, Assistant Engineer (Electrical Planning), South Eastern Division, British Electricity Authority (Hove)
 John Collijns, Supervisor, London County Council Rest Centre (Chingford, E.4)
 Frederick Harold Cook, Inshore Fisherman, Grimaby (Cleethorpes)
 Albert George Cooke, Honorary Collector, Street Savings Group, Kidderminster
 Raven Robert Eyland Cooper, Electrician, Weyboume Camp, War Office (Holt, Norfolk). For services during the recent floods in the Eastern Counties.
 John Edward Cowley, Inspector, Liverpool City Police Force
 Herbert Alvin Cox, Inspector, War Department Constabulary (Woolwich, S.E.I8)
 William Thomas James Cox, Radar Chain Installation Engineer, Marconi's Wireless Telegraph Company Ltd., Chelmsford (Pembroke)
 Albert Edmund John Craske, Mess Steward I, Air Ministry, Felixstowe, For services during the recent floods in the Eastern Counties.
 Edward James Crouch, Staff Instructor, Mill Hill School (Hendon, N.W.4)
 Charles Edward Cunliffe, Postman, Head Post Office, Chester
 Ena Cunningham, Honorary Collector, Works Savings Group, William Strain & Sons, Ltd., Belfast (Holywood, Co. Down)
 Harold Welby Curtis, Depot Superintendent, Sheerness Depot, Medway Group, British Road Services (Minster, Kent). For services during the recent floods in the Eastern Counties.
 Graham Frederick Flaxman Daniels, Detective Inspector, Norfolk County Constabulary (King's Lynn). For services during the recent floods in the Eastern Counties.
 Audrey Gertrude Daubrah, Commandant, North Lincolnshire Detachment, British Red Cross Society (Alford, Lincoln-shire). For services during the recent floods in the Eastern Counties.
 Hannah Davies, Forewoman, Simmonds Aerocessories Ltd., Treforest (Cardiff)
 William Walter Davis, Chargeman of Painters, H.M. Dockyard, Portland (Weymouth)
 Ernest Dean, lately Tool Room Miller, Renold & Coventry Chain Company Ltd., Manchester
 Hugh Delvin, Chief Observer, Post J.3, No. 34 Group, Royal Observer Corps, Glasgow
 Walter Douglas Denholm, Principal Smith, N. Hingley & Sons Ltd., Dudley, Worcestershire
 William John Dew, Warden, Territorial Army Drill Hall, Bristol
 Wilfred Frank Digby, Chief Paper Keeper, Tithe Redemption Commission (Leytonstone, E.11)
 John Michael Dobson, Coastguard-in-Charge, H.M. Coastguard Station, Felixstowe, For services during the recent floods in the Eastern Counties.
 Edward Willie Dodd, Mechanic Examiner, Ministry of Supply (West Wickham, Kent)
 Dorothy Kathleen Double, Assistant Supervisor, Telephone Exchange, Stow-market, Suffolk
 Charles Archibald Downes, Chief Inspector, Bristol Tramways and Carriage Company Ltd. (Bristol)
 Geoffrey Stephen Drewery, Motor Vehicle Fitter, Snettisham Depot, British Road Services (Snettisham, Norfolk). For services during, the recent floods in the Eastern Counties.
 David Clark Dunlop, Section Leader, Southwestern Area Fire Brigade, Scotland (Irvine, Ayrshire)
 Mary Jeanne Edwards, Restaurant Superintendent, N.A.A.F.I., Malaya
 Robert William Edwards, Mess Steward. War Office, Larkhill
 William Edwards  Safety and Training Officer, East Walbottle Colliery, Northern (Northumberland and Cumberland) Division, National Coal Board (Newcastle upon Tyne)
 Joseph Elkington, Store-keeper, Leeds Government Training Centre, Ministry of Labour and National Service
 Edith Ellen Elloway, Manageress, Refreshment Club, Head Post Office, Newport
 Walter Elton, Underground Datal Worker, Clipstone Colliery, East Midlands Division, National Coal Board (Mansfield)
 Sidney Horace Empson, General Foreman, East Suffolk and Norfolk River Board (Great Yarmouth). For services during the recent floods in the Eastern Counties.
 Albert Joseph English, Senior Messenger, Cabinet Office (South Lambeth, S.W.8)
 The Reverend Leslie Abbott Erving, Warden and Civil Defence Instructor, Easington, For services during the recent floods in the Eastern Counties.
 Edwin Stanley Evans, Chargehand Process Worker, Grade I, Royal Ordnance Factory, Pembrey (Llanelly, Carmarthenshire)
 William Hugh Evans, Chief Steward, R.M.S. Cambria, British Transport Commission (Holyhead)
 James Fairley, Underground Repairer, Northfield Colliery, Scottish Division, National Coal Board (Shotts, Lanarkshire)
 Harold Edward Farwell, School Caretaker, Essex Local Education Authority (Thundersley, Essex). For services during the recent floods in the Eastern Counties.
 Hilda Folwell, Convoy Organiser, Women's Voluntary Services, Barrow-on-Soar, Leicestershire (Cropston, Leicestershire). For service during the recent floods in the Eastern Counties.
 Evelyn W. Foote, Verger and Sub-Sacrist, Westminster Abbey (Holborn, E.C.I)
 John Fulton, Head Foreman Plumber, Harland & Wolff, Ltd., London (Eltham, S.E.9)
 Walter Vincent Furness, Chief Observer, Post E.I. No. 7 Group, Royal Observer Corps, Manchester (Altrincham)
 Edith May Garlick, Honorary Collector, Street Savings Group, Stockport
 Frank Gee, Chief Inspector, Lancashire Constabulary (Preston)
 Thomas Watkin George, Sub-Postmaster, Greengates Town -Sub-Office, Bradford (Leeds)
 Frank Thomas Gerrish, Foreman, Brentford, Railway Executive, Western Region (West Ealing, W.13)
 George William Henry Gibson, Senior Foreman, Remploy Factory, Radcliffe (Hollin-jwood, Lancashire)
 Richard Gilbert, Foreman, Holman Brothers Ltd., Camborne, Cornwall
 George Thomas Gill, Pumping Attendant, Sewage Works, Thurrock Urban District Council (Grays, Essex). For services during the recent floods in the Eastern Counties.
 George Glaysher, Mechanic, National Physical Laboratory (Teddington, Middlesex)
 Derek Daniel Glover, Member, British Red Cross Society (Belvedere, Kent). For services during the recent floods in the Eastern Counties.
 Joseph Glover, lately Chief Steward, Trinity House Vessel Patricia (Dovercourt, Essex)
 Harry Hare Goodhand, Lineman, Class II, Railway Executive (Immingham, Lincolnshire). For services during the recent floods in the Eastern Counties.
 Harold Goodson, Head Foreman Boilersmith, United Steel Structural Company Ltd. (Scunthorpe)
 Walter Gothard, Smallholder, Tilbury, For services during the recent floods in the Eastern Counties.
 Ada Gough, Chief Closing Room Supervisor, J. A. Sabin, Ltd., Leicester
 Evelyn Gwendoline Grange, Centre Organiser, Herne Bay, Women's Voluntary Services, For services during the recent floods in the Eastern Counties.
 Mona Grant, Assistant County Organiser, County of London, Women's Voluntary Services (South Kensington, S.W.7)
 Norah Patricia Gray, Woman Chief Inspector, Birmingham City Police Force
 Ronald Gray, Foreman, Great Ouse River Board (Thetford, Norfolk). For services during the recent floods in the Eastern Counties.
 Percy Edward Green, Technician, Class II(A), Engineering Department, General Post Office (Brentwood, Essex)
 Howard William Greenaway, Sub-Inspector, Metropolitan Special Constabulary (Wimbledon, S.W.19)
 Bertrand Griffiths, Engraver and Chaser, Pearson Page Jewsbury Company Ltd. (Dudley, Worcestershire)
 Frank Albert Griffiths, Sub-Officer, Essex Fire Brigade (Canvey Island, Essex). For services during the recent floods in the Eastern Counties.
 Horace Edward Griggs, Works Superintendent, Kent River Board (Aylesford, Kent). For services during the recent floods in the Eastern Counties.
 William Henry Grindrod, Station Officer, Warwickshire Fire Brigade (Kenilworth)
 Cecil Grout, Crane Driver, R.N. Air Station, Lee-on-Solent, For services during the recent floods in the Eastern Counties.
 Frederick Midgley Guest, Honorary Collector, Carriage and Wagon Department, H.2. Shop Savings Group, British Railways, Derby
 Ronald Francis Gurney, Mobile Canteen Driver, N.A.A.F.I. Colchester (Honington, Suffolk). For services during the recent floods in the Eastern Counties.
 Ernest Charles Guy, Chief Petty Officer Instructor, Carlisle Unit, Sea Cadet Corps
 Thomas Charles Hackett, Foreman Bricklayer, Phillips Cycles Ltd., Smethwick
 James Alexander Hadden, Foreman, Barry Ostlere & Shepherd Ltd., Kirkcaldy
 Thomas Hagart, Mess Steward, Grade I, (Royal Air Force Station, Andover (Am-port, Hampshire)
 Harold Hall, Custodian of Ancient Monuments, Ministry of Works (Muchelney Abbey, Somerset)
 Hilda Hall, Honorary Collector, New Tredegar (Village) Savings Group (Aberbargoed)
 Charles Hampton, Omnibus Driver, Thames Valley Traction Company Ltd. (Reading)
 Alice Hanks, Centre Organiser, Sheerness, Women's Voluntary Services, For services during the recent floods in the Eastern Counties.
 Doris Hardy, Member, Women's Voluntary Services, East Suffolk (Aldeburgh, Suffolk). For services during the recent floods in the Eastern Counties.
 Ernest Victor Harker, Senior Assistant (Scientific), Ministry of Pensions Hospital, Mossley Hill, Liverpool
 Cecil James Harris, Clerk of Works (Electrical), War Office, Malta
 Thomas Harris, Chief Instructor, Government Training Centre, Ministry of Labour and National Service (Barking, Essex)
 James Arthur Harrison, Foreman, H. Sullen & Sons Ltd., Cromer, For services during the recent floods in the Eastern Counties.
 James Harte, Honorary Collector, Drumaness Mill Savings Group, Ballynahinch, Co. Down
 Ada Ellen Harvey, Divisional Nursing Superintendent, St. John Ambulance Brigade, Grays, For services during the recent floods in the Eastern Counties.
 Percy Harvey, Warden, Civil Defence Corps, Tilbury, For services during the recent floods in the Eastern Counties.
 Hassin Bin Ahmad, Mobile Cinema Operator and Driver, Army Kinema Corporation, Malaya
 Raymond Hasthorpe, Lorry Driver, Waithe, Lincolnshire, For services during the recent floods in the Eastern Counties.
 Roland Henry Hastings, Installation Inspector, Sheffield District, Yorkshire Electricity Board (Sheffield)
 Walter Charles Hatcher, Greaser, M.V. Stirling Castle, Union Castle Mail Steamship Company Ltd. (Southampton)
 Leonora Hayne, Deputy County Organiser, Kent, Women's Voluntary Services (Langton, Kent). For services during the recent floods in the Eastern Counties.
 Charles Higgs  Warden, Civil Defehce Corps, Isle of Grain, Kent, For services during the recent floods in the Eastern Counties.
 Alfred Holding, Boilermaker, R. & H. Green & Silley Weir, Ltd., Royal Albert Docks (Custom House, E.16)
 Rene Stanger Holland, Canteen Supervisor, Gee, Walker and Slater Ltd. (Derby). For services during the recent floods in the Eastern Counties.
 Clarence Montague Hollis, Inspector, City of London Special Constabulary (Bush Hill Park, Middlesex)
 John Cormack Hood, Principal Officer, H.M. Prison, Aberdeen
 David William Hopkin, Linesman, South Wales Electricity Board (Pontyclun)
 Alfred Hopkinson, School Catiretaker, Lincolnshire (Lindsey) Local Education Authority (Cleethorpes). For services during the recent floods in the Eastern Counties.
 Susan Horan, Centre Organiser, Chepstow Urban District, Women's Voluntary Services
 Herbert Horton, Smallholder, Saltfleet, Lincolnshire, For services during the recent floods in the Eastern Counties.
 Thomas David Horton, Chargehand Coal Plant Operator, South Wales Division, British Electricity Authority (Pontypridd)
 William Edward' Howes, Sergeant, Essex County Constabulary (Canvey Island). For services during the recent floods in the Eastern Counties.
 Elizabeth Howorth, Honorary Collector, Street Savings Groups, West Denton, Newcastle upon Tyne
 Frederick Payne Hudson, Maintenance Fitter, British Industrial Solvents, Ltd. (Hull)
 Marjorie Hughes, Centre Organiser, Barnstaple, Women's Voluntary Services
 Robert Edwin Hughes, Checkweighman, North Eastern Division, National Coal Board (Doncaster)
 William Hughes, Manager, Group Training Centre (Whitwood Colliery), North Eastern Division, National Coal Board (Normanton)
 William John Hughes, Chargeman of Caulkers, H.M. Dockyard, Sheerness, For services during the recent floods in the Eastern Counties.
 Henry Charles Hunt, Leather Sorter, Dent, Allcroft and Company, Ltd. (Worcester)
 John Husbands, Electrical Fitter, Electric Construction Company, Wolverhampton (Wednesfield)
 Robert Stephen Irwin, Detective Sergeant, Royal Ulster Constabulary (Hillsborough, Co. Down)
 Phyllis Katherine James, Honorary Collector, Street Savings Group, Bristol
 George Nicol Jarvis, Carpenter, M.V. Wairangi, Shaw Sawill and Albion Company, Ltd. (East Ham, E.6)
 Jasper Sidney Jeal, Centre Lathe Turner, Dewrance & Co. Ltd, London (Bexley Heath, Kent)
 August Thomas Jensen, Licensee, Lowestoft, For services during the recent floods in the Eastern Counties.
 Helen Ada Jerome, Rest Centre Leader, Erith, Kent, For services during the recent floods in the Eastern Counties.
 Robert John, Underground Repairer, South Western Division, National Coal Board (Rhondda)
 Harold Raine Johnson, Engineering and Main
 Tenance Foreman, Whessoe Ltd., Darlington
 Harry Johnson, Surface Labourer, Silverdale Colliery, West Midlands Division, National Coal Board (Silverdale)
 Daniel Jones, Leading Hand, Zinc Distillation Plant, National Smelting Company, Ltd., Swansea (Neath)
 Ernest Jones, Shift Supervisor, Bradford Road Station, Manchester Group, North Western Gas Board (Manchester)
 Maud H. Jones, Personal Assistant, Headquarters, Women's Voluntary Service (Bethnal Green, E.2)
 Sidney Richard Jones, Mechanical Fitter, Midlands Electricity Board (Birmingham)
 Thomas Roger Jones, Skilled Labourer, R.N. Hospital Chatham (Gillingham, Kent)
 William Henry Jones, Foreman, Hemp Small Splicing Department, Wrights' Ropes, Ltd. (Birmingham)
 William Thomas Jones, Head Driver, Vange Ambulance Station, Essex, For services during the recent floods in the Eastern Counties.
 Richard Judd, Gas Fitter, Distribution Department, Salisbury Gas Undertaking, Southern Gas Board (Salisbury)
 Harold Juniper, Works Supervisor, Whitstable Urban District Council, For services during the recent floods in the Eastern Counties.
 Alexander Frederick King, Telephone Operator, War Office, Sheerness, For services during the recent floods in the Eastern Counties.
 John Allen Kirby, Artificer, R.N. Engineering Laboratory (Hounslow, Middlesex)
 George Christopher Kirton, Skilled Setter, Royal Ordnance Factory, Birtley (Sunderland)
 John William Kyle, Radio Mechanic, Grade I, Telecommunications Section, Ministry of Civil Aviation (Glasgow)
 William Bertie Land, Reclamation Foreman, H.M. Borstal Institution, North Sea Camp (Frieston, Lincolnshire)
 Arthur Langfield, Engineer, Walter Pollard (1923) Ltd. (Nelson)
 Albert Edward Langford, Technician, Class I, Post Office Telephone Exchange, Tiverton, Devon (Wellington, Somerset)
 Jane Laverty, Auxiliary Postwoman, Priestland Sub Office, Co. Antrim
 William Edward Lawrence, Senior Assistant, Zoological Society of London (Northold, Middlesex)
 Leonard Leach, Process Foreman, Magnesium Elektron, Ltd. (Manchester)
 Hannah Dorothea Leeman, Centre Organiser, Spilsby, Women's Voluntary Services (Addlethorpe, Lincolnshire). For services during the recent floods in the Eastern Counties.
 Alfred Henry Leonard, Overseer, General Post Office (Honor Oak Park, S.E.23)
 William Lewis, Senior Storeman, Proof and Experimental Establishment, Ministry of Supply (Pendine, Carmarthenshire)
 Leslie George Ling, Special Constable, East Suffolk County Constabulary (Iken, Suffolk). For services during the recent floods in the Eastern Counties.
 Ernest Colin McArthur, Transport Foreman and Deputy Fitting Foreman, Stockton Unit, Northern Gas Board (Stockton-on-Tees)
 Percy James Thompson Macaulay, Leading Draughtsman, Cammell Laifd and Company, Birkenhead (Wallasey, Cheshire)
 Alexander McCulloch, Chargehand, Drysdale and Company, Ltd., Glasgow
 Charles Alfred Mace, Underground Repairer, Llanharan Colliery, South Western Division, National Coal Board (Pencoed)
 John MacFarlane, Blind Telephone Operator, Export Credits Guarantee Department (Ilford, Essex)
 James McGowan, Repairer and Pumper, Gate-side Colliery, Scottish Division, National Coal Board (Sanquhar, Dumfriesshire)
 Annie McIntosh, Senior Leading Fire-woman, North-Eastern Fire Brigade, Scotland (Aberdeen)
 Philip McKeever, Able Seaman, S.S. Esso Bedford, Esso Transportation Company, Ltd. (Belfast)
 John Turnley McKinley, Sergeant, Londonderry Harbour Police
 Gilbert McKirdy, Boatswain, Fishery Board for Scotland (Rothesay, Bute)
 David Mcruvie, Deckhand, Fishing Vessel William Wilson (Cellardykes, Fife)
 Walter Makepeace, Boiler House Maintenance Engineer, Southport Power Station, Mersey-side and North Wales Division, British Electricity Authority (Southport)
 Edwin Martin, Surface Workman, Oxcroft Colliery, East Midlands Division, National Coal Board (Chesterfield)
 Royston Henry Massey, Station Warden, Royal Air Force Station, Pembroke Dock
 Robert Mayne, Boatswain, S.S. Baron Elgin, H. Hogarth and Sons (Edinburgh)
 William Ivor Merrett, Chief Steward, Falfield Civil Defence Technical Training School, Gloucestershire
 James Mew, Leading Hand of Pensioners, H.M.S. Victory (Ship) (Southsea)
 Evaline Miller, Assistant Billeting Officer, Glasgow, Women's Voluntary Services
 William James Miller, Coastguard, H.M. Coastguard Station, Felixstowe, For services during the recent floods in the Eastern Counties.
 Elizabeth Lily Mills, School Meals Organiser, Great Yarmouth County Borough, For services during the recent floods in the Eastern Counties.
 John William Mills, Foreman, Robert Fletcher and Sons, Ltd. (Greenfield, Yorkshire)
 Albert Mitchell, Farm Worker, Dunsden, near Reading
 Ernest John Monk, Ganger, Essex River Board (Rochford, Essex). For services during the recent floods in the Eastern Counties.
 George Francis Henry Moore, Cigarette Machine Operator, Carreras, Ltd. (Highbury, N.5)
 Hopkin Morris, Underground Overman, South Western Division, National Coal Board (Glamorgan)
 William George Morris, Foreman, Craftsman Vellum and Parchment Maker, H. Band and Company, Ltd. (Isleworth, Middlesex)
 Bruce Mosley, Driver, Nottingham Depot, Trent Motor Traction Company, Ltd. (Nottingham)
 Ernest Mountford, Assistant Superintendent, Head Post Office, Stoke-on-Trent (Newcastle, Staffordshire)
 James Muir, District Manager, Gas Works, Galston, Scottish Gas Board
 Edward W. Mumford, Fisherman, Great Wakering, Essex, For services during the recent floods in the Eastern Counties.
 Isaac Murphy, Technician, Class II (B), Belfast Telephone Area
 Joseph Murray, Foreman Armature Winder, Tuscan Engineering Company, Ltd., Bridgend
 Eileen Mary Musgrove, Postal and Telegraph Officer, Head Post Office, Richmond, Yorkshire
 Dorothy Mary Newell, Commandant, Claydon Detachment, British Red Cross Society (Claydon, Suffolk). For services during the recent floods in the Eastern Counties.
 Dorothy Newsam, Centre Organiser, Hoddesdon Urban District, Women's Voluntary Services (Broxbourne)
 William Edward Nutting, Hot Saw Grinder, Round Oak Steel Works, Ltd., Brierley Hill
 Frank Alfred Oliver, General Foreman, Turriff Construction Corporation, Ltd. (Croydon, Surrey)
 George Oxenbredge, Head Gardener, North-West European District, Imperial War Graves Commission
 Reginald George Pain, Setter-Operator, AC-Delco Division of General Motors, Ltd., Dunstable (Luton)
 Richard Harold Parker, Chief Inspector, South Western District Post Office (Worcester Park, Surrey)
 Elizabeth Parry, Screenhand, Nook Colliery, North Western Division, National Coal Board (Tyldesley, Lancashire)
 Alice Pateman, Press Operator, E. S. Perry, Ltd. (Edmonton, N.I8)
 Joseph William Percival Payton, General Foreman, Surveyor's Department, Sheerness Urban District Council, For services during the recent floods in the Eastern Counties.
 Ernest Edward Peach, Foreman Electrician, Patent Shaft and Axletree Company, Ltd., Wednesbury
 Joan Peacock, Spinner, Finlayson, Bousfield and Company, Ltd., Johnstone, Renfrewshire
 James Pearce, Chargehand Installation Inspector, Canvey Island, For services during the recent floods in the Eastern Counties.
 Robert Lennie Pearson, Assistant Divisional Officer, Norfolk Fire Brigade (King's Lynn). For services during the recent floods in the Eastern Counties.
 Thomas William Pestell, Foreman and Bacon Drier, I. Beer and Sons, Ltd. (Walthamstow, E.17)
 Sidney George Phillips, Chief Engineer of a steam trawler (Milford Haven)
 Henry William Philpott  lately Vocational Training Instructor, H.M. Dockyard, Chatham (Gillingham, Kent)
 John Peter William Pilkington, Foreman Labourer, Rolls-Royce, Ltd., Barnoldswick
 Margaret Pitcher, Centre Organiser, Maidenhead, Women's Voluntary Services
 Emily Pitkin, Catering Supervisor, Erith, For services during the recent floods in the Eastern Counties.
 Frederick Platt, Fitter, Ede and Ravenscroft, Ltd., Robemakers (Ashford, Middlesex)
 Alice Mary Pleasants, Honorary Collector, Ranspme Sims and Jefferies Savings Group, Ipswich
 Arthur Plowman, Foreman Dyer, Edward and James Richardson, Ltd., Newcastle upon Tyne
 Norah Porritt, Centre Organiser, Basford Rural District (South) Nottinghamshire, Women's Voluntary Services
 Frederick Albert Potter, Telephone Mechanic, Factories Department, General Post Office (Kenton, Middlesex), ?Lincolnshire Fire Brigade (Louth, Lincolnshire). For services during the recent floods in the Eastern Counties.
 Joseph Edwin Prothero, Electrical Fitter, English Electric Company, Ltd., Stafford
 Ernest Prout, Machine Shop Foreman, Priestman Brothers, Ltd., Hull
 Sydney Lawrence Purse, Mechanic, Ministry of Supply (Stockwell, S.W.9)
 Roger Richard Quinn, Head Storekeeper, Sea Transport Stores, Ministry of Transport, Bristol (Yate, Gloucestershire)
 Leonard Raven, Farm Foreman, Tillingham, Essex, For services during the recent floods in the Eastern Counties.
 Charles Edward Reddin, Sub-Officer, North Riding of Yorkshire Fire Brigade (Northallerton)
 Charles William Redford, Head Forester, Forestry Commission (Santon Downham, Suffolk). For services during the recent floods in the Eastern Counties.
 Robert William George Rees, Chief Officer, Class I, H.M. Prison, Liverpool
 James Henry Reid, Inspector, Birmingham City Police Force
 Frederick James Richards, Engineering Craftsman. Chatwood Safe and Engineering Company, Shrewsbury
 Trevor Richards, Dock Worker, National Dock Labour Board (Swansea)
 Charles Thomas Richardson, Transport Foreman, Hadfields, Ltd., Sheffield
 Maureen Riley, Voluntary Worker, Canvey Island (Sheffield). For services during the recent floods in the Eastern Counties.
 James Gordon Lennox Robertson, Postman, Higher Grade, Head Post Office, Perth
 Corneille Robinson, Centre Organiser, Whitstable, Women's Voluntary Services, For services during the recent floods in the Eastern Counties.
 John Henry Robson, Foreman Glass Blower, Hartley Wood and Company, Sunderland
 James Alfred Rudling, lately Works Superintendent, St. Mary Cray Gasworks (Ramsgale)
 Frances Marion Rundle, Centre Organiser, Dovercourt, Women's Voluntary Services. For services during the recent floods in the Eastern Counties
 John Rushton, Overman, Sandhole Colliery, North Western Division, National Coal Board (Walkden, Lancashire)
 George Sanday, Staff Instructor, Rossall School, Fleetwood
 Frederick Sandcraft, Mess Superintendent, Royal Military Academy, Sandhurst (Camberley, Surrey)
 Frank William Sargisson, Senior Driver, Lincolnshire Road Car Company, Ltd. (Lincoln)
 Walter Frank Savage, Baker and Confectioner, M.V. Carnarvon Castle, Union Castle Mail Steamship Company, Ltd. (Southampton)
 William Sayner, Works Engineer, Grimsiby Gas Undertaking, East Midlands Gas Board (Grimsby)
 Spiro Scerri, Supervisor (Mechanical and Electrical), Air Ministry Works Repair Depot, Suez Canal Zone
 Harold Scobey, Station Master, Parkeston, Essex, For services during the recent floods in the Eastern Counties.
 Michael Scott, Driller and Roof Sealer, Anhydrite Mine, Imperial Chemical Industries, Billingham
 Arthur Edward Searle, Chargeman of Skilled Labourers, H.M.S. Fisgard (Torpoint, Cornwall)
 Anthony Segui, Principal Foreman, War Office, Gibraltar
 Charlie William Thomas Setterfield, Inspector, Kent County Constabulary, Maidstone (Herne Bay). For services during the recent floods in the Eastern Counties.
 William James Sewell, Electrician, North Thames Gas Board (Westcliff on Sea). For services during the recent floods in the Eastern Counties.
 Emmanuel Shimon, Clerk, Grade I, Royal Air Force Levies, Iraq
 Eva Lena Shipley, Welfare Supervisor, Ferodo, Ltd., Stockport (Buxton)
 Edward Simmons, Chargeman Coppersmith, J. Russell and Company, Ltd., Liverpool
 Arthur Nicol Simpson, Head Forester, Tulliallan Nursery, Kincardine-on-Forth, Forestry Commission
 George Sinclair, Deckhand, Steam Trawler Gilmar (Aberdeen)
 Alfred Arthur Singer, Bandmaster, Duke of York's Royal Military School, Dover
 William Singleton  Station Foreman (Tickets), Preston, Railway Executive, London Midland Region (Preston)
 Charles Leonard Smith, Machinist, Littleton Colliery, West Midlands Division, National Coal Board (Cannock)
 Lucy Mary Smith, Chief Supervisor, Telephone Training School, Clerkenwell Telephone Exchange (Honor Oak Park, S.E.23)
 Robert William Smith, Divisional Superintendent, St. John Ambulance Brigade, Hunstanton, For services during the recent floods in the Eastern Counties.
 Wilfred Smith, Divisional Superintendent, St. John Ambulance Brigade, Selby, Yorkshire, For services during the recent floods in the Eastern Counties.
 John Spelman  Principal Doorkeeper, House of Lords (Kennington, S.E.ll)
 James Spowart, Inspector, Perthshire and Kinrossshire Constabulary (Perth)
 Firth Squire, Warehouseman, British Belting and Asbestos, Ltd. (Cleckheaton)
 Reginald Stuart Steadman, Resident Inspector, North Thames Gas Board, Grays, Essex, For services during the recent floods in the Eastern Counties.
 Cyril Herbert Stedman, Depot Manager, Dart-ford, Kent, House Coal Distribution (Emergency)
 Scheme (Dartford, Kent)
 Arthur Leonard Stent, Staff Instructor, Royal Grammar School, Guildford
 Harold Richard Stephens, General Handyman, Tilbury, For services during the recent floods in the Eastern Counties.
 Lina Stephenson, Honorary Collector, Street and Village Savings Group, Patrington, Hull
 Septimus Stobbart, Coal Filler, Pegswood Colliery, Northern (Northumberland and Cumberland) Division, National Coal Board (Morpeth)
 Edward George Joseph Stokes, Boatswain, Admiralty (Dovercourt). For services during the recent floods in the Eastern Counties.
 David Edward Stringer, Station Officer, H.M. Coastguard Station, Lizard, Cornwall
 Thomas Bernard Strong, Foreman of Trades, Royal Air Force Station, Hawarden (Chester)
 Edward Bradstock Tanner, Overseer of Birds, Zoological Society of London (Finchley, N.3)
 Wilfred Arthur Tanner, General Foreman, Richard Costain, Ltd. (Carshalton, Surrey)
 Samuel Taylor, Foreman, Lincolnshire River Board (Grimsby). For services during the recent floods in the Eastern Counties.
 John Arthur Thelwell, Permanent Way Inspector, Reading, Railway Executive, Western Region (Reading)
 Edward James Thomas, Staff Foreman, Morris Motors, Ltd., Llanelly
 Frank Thomas, Head Foreman Loftsman, Vickers-Armstrongs, Ltd., Barrow-in-Furness
 Lydia Olwen Thomas, Group Officer, Glamorganshire Fire Brigade (Llanelly)
 William Thomas, Underground worker, Hafod Colliery, North Western Division, National Coal Board (Wrexham)
 Thomas Charles Thompson, Boiler Shop Plater, Harland and Wolff, Ltd., Belfast
 Charles Trego, Coal Conveyor Attendant, South Western Division, British Electricity Authority (Weston-super-Mare)
 William Oliver Trotman, Distribution Superintendent, Stratford-upon-Avon District Undertaking, West Midlands Gas Board (Stratford-upon-Avon)
 Frederick Tunstall, Salvage Worker, Clifton Colliery, Northern (Northumberland and Cumberland) Division, National Gas Board (Workington)
 Frank Turner  Underground Repairer, Snowdon Colliery, South Eastern Division, National Coal Board (Canterbury)
 Harry Ernest Edward Wade, Works Foreman, West Minster Works, Sheerness, South Eastern Gas Board, For services during the recent floods in the Eastern Counties.
 Henry Wady, Production Foreman, Humber Works, G. and T. Earle, Ltd., Cement Manufacturers (Melton)
 Charles Geoffrey Walker, Carpenter, War Office, Humfoer Sea Forts (Barnetby, Lincolnshire)
 Percival Walton, Publications Storekeeper, Victoria and Albert Museum (Walham Green, S.W.6)
 William Walton, Checbweighman and Lodge Secretary, Medomsley Colliery, Durham Division, National Coal Board (Consett)
 Charles Warde, Tool Shop Assistant Foreman, Automatic Telephone and Electric Company, Ltd., Liverpool (Prescot)
 Harry Wardle, Chief Foreman Fitter, Walmsleys (Bury) Ltd., Bury
 William Watkiss, Hotel Manager, Sutton-on-Sea, Lincolnshire, For services during the recent floods in the Eastern Counties.
 Lilian Dorothy Watts, Draughtswoman, Highways Engineering Department, Ministry of Transport (Norbury, S.W.I6)
 Annie Webber, Leader of First Aid Post, St. John Ambulance Nursing Division, South-end, For services during the recent floods in the Eastern Counties.
 William John Webber, Foreman, Aluminium Wire and Cable Company, Ltd., Port Tennant, Swansea
 Arthur Charles Stanley Wescott, Foreman, Royal Observatory (New Eltham, S.E.9)
 Eileen May West, Manageress N.A.A.F.I., Weybourne (Epsom Downs, Surrey). For services during the recent floods in the Eastern Counties.
 Mark Randall Wheatley, Foreman Turbine Driver, Spondon Power Station, East Midlands Division, British Electricity Authority (Hkeston, Derbyshire)
 Jack Whyman, Shop Foreman, Royal Air Force Station, Quedgeley (Gloucester)
 Lawrence Gerald Wickham, Station Officer, Kent Fire Brigade (Sheerness). For services during the recent floods in the Eastern Counties.
 John Walter Wilding, Head Cheesemaker, Minsterley Creameries, Ltd., Minsterley, Shropshire
 Owen Williams, Honorary Collector, Marchwiel Village Savings Group (Wrexham)
 William Williams, Surface Worker, Woodend Colliery, Scottish Division, National Coal Board (Maddiston, Stirlingshire)
 Harry Willsmer, Farm Foreman, Great Wakering, Essex, For services during the recent floods in the Eastern Counties.
 John Willsmer, Farm Worker, Great Wakering, Essex, For services during the recent floods in the Eastern Counties.
 William Andrew Wilson, Sub-Postmaster, Tynron, Thornhill, Dumfriesshire
 Cecil Frederick Witt, Head Gardener, French District, Imperial War Graves Commission
 Norman John Wood, Inspector, Essex County Constabulary (Harwich). For services during the recent floods in the Eastern Counties.
 George Woodcock, Chief Inspector, West Riding of Yorkshire Constabulary (Wakefield)
 Arthur Clifford Wragg, Coal Plant Supervisor, Rotherham Power Station, Yorkshire Division, British Electricity Authority (Rotherham)
 Edward Thomas Wright, Warden, Territorial Army Drill Hall, Norwich
 Ernest Wright, Carpenter, Veterinary Laboratory, Ministry of Agriculture and Fisheries (New Haw, Weybridge)
 Frank Arthur Wright, Yard Foreman, Leeds District Distribution and Transport Department, North Eastern Gas Board (Leeds)
 Alfred Wyatt, Kiln Burner, Tondu Brickworks Company, Ltd., Aberkenfig, Bridgend
 Thomas Henry Young, Mate in Charge, R.A.S.C. Vessel Fusee (Weymouth)

State of South Australia
 Walter Muggleton, Messenger, Department of the Premier, State of South Australia

Colonial Empire
 Charles Samuel Thorne, Head Keeper, South Point Lighthouse, Barbados
 Donald Abrams, Engineer, Georgetown Fire Brigade, British Guiana
 Alexander Bertfield Clarke, lately Sergeant Major, British Honduras Police Force
 Hussein Zihni Mehmed, Senior Compositor, Printing Department, Cyprus
 Kyriacos Nicolaides, Mukhtar at Peyia, Cyprus
 Dharam Dev Mayor, Station Master, Kampala, East Africa High Commission
 Zainal Abidin Bin Mohamed Lati, Penghulu of Lenggeng Mukim, Federation of Malaya
 Abu Bakar Bin Tahir, Engineman, Marine Department, Federation of Malaya
 Krishnaswamy Iyer Balasubramaniam, Clerk, Police Clerical Service, Federation of Malaya
 Chow Fong, Headman of Sikamat New Village, Federation of Malaya
 Louis Victor John, Technical Assistant, Drainage and Irrigation Department, Selangor, Federation of Malaya
 Keow Chong Ghee, Station Master, Malayan Railway, Federation of Malaya
 Lim Swee Hun, Chief Clerk, Penang Library, Federation of Malaya
 Mohamed Bin Awang Noh, Penghulu of Temerloh District, Federation of Malaya
 Phang Mok Sen, Interpreter, Integrity Commission, Federation of Malaya
 Tam Chin Siong, Chairman, M.C.A., Kuala Pilah Branch, Federation of Malaya
 Voon Wan, Assistant Mechanical Superintendent, Drainage and Irrigation Department, Federation of Malaya
 Yahya Bin Haji Abdul Aziz, Penghulu, Mukim of Bakri, Johore, Federation of Malaya
 Haji Yusof Bin Haji Nordin, Storekeeper, Federal Police Stores, Federation of Malaya
 Benjamin Allassan, Chargeman, Works Department, Gold Coast
 Kojo Kessie, Chief Warder, Prison Service, Gold Coast
 Parmenas Kiritu Njagi, President, Naivasha African Court, Kenya
 Justus Muema Nzau, Hospital Assistant, Kitui Native Civil Hospital, Kenya
 Tiamiyu Aminu Bolaji, Tax Collector, Nigeria
 Chief Mukobela, Chief of the Ila tribe, Northern Rhodesia
 Dason Stokes Mukupa, Head Master, Lunzuwa Primary School, Northern Rhodesia
 Franklin Temba, African Clerk, Provincial Administration, Northern Rhodesia
 Kotali Stephen McLaren Masseah, Head Clerk, District Headquarters, Cholo, Nyasaland Protectorate
 Ishmael Mwale, Member, African Protectorate Council, Nyasaland Protectorate
 Abdi Dualeh, Broadcaster Clerk, Information Department, Somaliland Protectorate
 Haji Mohamoud Jama, Akil of the Dolbahanta tribe, Somaliland Protectorate
 Jama Mohamoud, Akil of the Habr Toljaala tribe, Somaliland Protectorate
 David Mkome, son of Nyamhagata, Clerk, Junior Service, Tanganyika
 Omari, son of Nghanyanga, Sergeant Major, Tanganyika Police Force
 Barnaba Leslie Reginald Saitte, Cashier, Junior Service, Tanganyika
 Ali, son of Keni, Chief Warder, Luzira Central Prison, Uganda
 Frank Douglas Slocombe, Senior Messenger, Office of the Comptroller, Development and Welfare Organisation, West Indies
 Suleiman Mussa, Nurse, Ziwani Police Lines, Zanzibar Protectorate

Imperial Service Order (ISO) 
Home Civil Service
 Robert Alexander  Principal Examiner, Board of Trade (Welwyn Garden City)
 Edgar James Allies  Accountant-General, Commonwealth Relations office (South Woodford, E.18)
 William Hales Ballard, Chief Executive Officer, Home Office (Norbury, S.W.16)
 Cecil John Bruce  Assistant Controller, H.M. Stationery Office (Wallhigton, Surrey)
 Gilbert Henderson Clark, Chief Executive Officer, Scottish Home Department (Edinburgh)
 James Austin Clarke, Deputy Director, Warehousing Division, Ministry of Food (North Harrow, Middlesex)
 John Thomas Darling, Deputy Director of Audit, Exchequer and Audit Department (Barnet, Hertfordshire)
 Frederick Raine Ennos, Senior Principal Scientific Officer, Government Chemist's Department (Croydon, Surrey)
 Sidney Stephen John Evans, Principal, War Office (Cricklewood, N.W.2)
 William Owen Forth, Assistant Director, Finance Division, Ministry of Transport (New Maiden, Surrey)
 Harold Charles Hawkins, Principal, Ministry of Fuel and Power (Surbiton, Surrey)
 George Francis Hendy, Chief Accountant, Board of Customs and Excise (Bromley, Kent)
 Charles William Grove Hull, Assistant Accountant General, Ministry of National Insurance (Mortlake, S.W.14)
 James Henry Jones, Chief Engineer, Ministry of Finance, Northern Ireland (Belfast)
 Arthur Henry Keighley, Grade 2 Officer, Branch B, Foreign Office (Forest Hill, S.E.23)
 David Chalmers Lamont, Chief Executive Officer, Ministry of Housing and Local Government (Hanwell, W.7)
 Edmund Hicks McCormack, Deputy Superintendent, Royal Mint (Ickenham, Middlesex)
 Kenneth McFarlane, Chief Examiner, Board of Inland Revenue (Ruislip, Middlesex)
 Bernard Patrick McGuinness, Principal, Ministry of Food (Muswell Hill, N.10)
 Charles Edgar Matthews, Chief Executive Officer, Ministry of Health (Lancing, Sussex)
 James Leslie Moffat, Regional Manager, Midland Regional Office, Central Land Board and War Damage Commission (Nottingham)
 James Fraser Montgomerie  Grade 2 Officer, Ministry of Labour and National Service (Glasgow)
 John Coombes Nerney, Librarian and Head of Air Historical Branch, Air Ministry (Wandsworth, S.W.18)
 John Gilbert Orr, Assistant Secretary, Ministry of Works (Watford)
 Frederick Arthur Phillips  Chief Organisation Officer, Ministry of Agriculture and Fisheries (Epsom Downs, Surrey)
 Leonard Road  Deputy Director of Stores, Admiralty (Bromley, Kent)
 Edward Ben Ruber, Director, Ministry of Pensions (Thornton, Lancashire)
 William Alfred Simester, Regional Finance Officer, Wales and Border Counties, General Post Office (Cardiff)
 George Arthur Sizmur, Chief Executive Officer, Procurator General and Treasury Solicitor's Office (Ruislip, Middlesex)
 Leslie Stephen Smith  Chief Executive Officer, Colonial Office (Woodside Park, N.12)
 William George Stedman, Senior Principal Clerk, Paymaster General's Office (Streatham, S.W.16)
 Frederick George Thompson, Principal, Ministry of Materials (Bromley, Kent)
 Clarence Roy Waterer, Chief Clerk in Bankruptcy, Board of Trade (Brighton)
 John Wilson, Assistant Director, Ministry of Supply (Faraham, Surrey)
 Kenneth John Wilson  Commissioner, National Savings Committee (Sanderstead, Surrey)

Australian States and Southern Rhodesia
 Harold Bruce Bennett  Director of Industrial Development, State of Tasmania
 Arthur Edward Cowie, Marketing Officer, and Chairman of the Grain Marketing Board, Department of Agriculture and Lands, Southern Rhodesia
 William Richard Penhall, Secretary, Aborigines Protection Board, State of South Australia

Colonial Civil Service
 George Horace William Annells, Assistant Commissioner of Lands, Kenya
 Arthur Ernest Fuller, Accountant General and Collector of Customs, Gilbert and Ellice Islands
 Thomas Buchanan Low, Assistant Director of Marine, Hong Kong
 Edward Finch Peck, Colonial Veterinary Service, Director of Agriculture and Veterinary Services, Somaliland
 Constantinos Loannou Stephani, Acting Comptroller of Inland Revenue, Cyprus

King's Police and Fire Services Medals (KPFSM) 
For Distinguished Service
Police – England and Wales
 Jesse Lawrence, Chief Constable, Reading Borough Police Force
 Cecil Haydn Watkins, Chief Constable, Glamorgan Constabulary
 Major Edgar Hare  Chief Constable, Cornwall Constabulary
 George Parfitt  Chief Constable, Barnsley Borough Police Force
 Richard Gill, Assistant Chief Constable, Hampshire Constabulary
 George Strachan MacDonald, Superintendent and Deputy Chief Constable, Middlesbrough Borough Police Force
 William Griffiths, Superintendent and Deputy Chief Constable, Halifax Borough Police Force
 Francis John Rawbone, Superintendent, Birmingham City Police Force
 William Elford, Chief Superintendent, West Riding of Yorkshire Constabulary
 Ralph George Buckingham, Superintendent and Deputy Chief Constable, Oxfordshire Constabulary
 Thomas Allen Roberts, Detective Superintendent, Surrey Constabulary
 Lewis Henry Bearne  Superintendent, Metropolitan Police
 Sidney George Wells  Chief Superintendent, Metropolitan Police

Police – Scotland
 John Adam Ross Murray  Chief Constable, Motherwell and Wishaw Burgh Police Force
 Thomas Meikle, Superintendent, Lothians and Peebles Constabulary

Fire Service – England and Wales
 Arthur John Probert, Assistant Chief Officer, Birmingham Fire and Ambulance Service
 Thomas Arthur Kelly, Chief Officer, Liverpool Fire Brigade
 Ind Edward Richmond, Divisional Officer, Grade II, London Fire Brigade
 Joseph Caceres, Chief Officer, Lincolnshire (Ondsey) Fire Brigade

Fire Service – Scotland
 Thomas McCorkindale  Divisional Officer (Deputy Firemaster), Western Area Fire Brigade

Police – Colonies, Protected States and Trust Territories
 James Richard Henry Burns  Superintendent of Police, Federation of Malaya
 Edwin William Hunt  Superintendent of Police, Federation of Malaya
 Desmond Stephen Palmer  Superintendent of Police, Federation of Malaya
 Peter Irwin Montgomery Irwin, Assistant Commissioner of Police, Hong Kong
 George Ricarde Hodgson Gribble  Senior Superintendent of Police, Kenya
 Ian Stewart MacWalter Henderson, Assistant Superintendent of Police, Kenya
 Sandys Parker George  Commissioner of Police, Nigeria
 James Alexander MacDonald  Commissioner of Police, Nigeria
 Donald Evan Nickels  Superintendent of Police, Singapore
 Alastair Robert Anderson  Assistant Commissioner, Malayan Police, Singapore
 George Herbert Robins  Assistant Commissioner of Police, Tanganyika
 Arthur James Poppy  Senior Superintendent of Police, Tanganyika
 Lauraeston Sharp  Senior Superintendent of Police, Uganda
 Thomas Stewart Anderson  Superintendent of Police, Somaliland

Colonial Police Medals for Meritorious Service 
Bechuanaland Protectorate
 Bernard Robert Sands, Assistant Superintendent, Basutoland Mounted Police, at present seconded to Bechuanaland Protectorate Police

Swaziland
 Captain Patrick Charles Temple, Superintendent, Swaziland Police

Colonial Empire
 Arthur Leslie Abraham, Superintendent, British Honduras Police Force
 Ali, son of Qsman Noor, 1st Sergeant, Kenya Police Force
 Mohamed Ali, Force Sergeant Major, Nyasaland Police Force
 Mohamecl Ali Bin Dasib, Sergeant Major, Federation of Malaya Police Force
 Alwi bin Debok, Lance Sergeant, Federation of Malaya Police Force
 Attan Bin Makaran, Sub-Inspector, Federation of Malaya Police Force
 Ayob Bin Othnian, Sub-Inspector, Federation of Malaya Police Force
 Jacob Burnett Baidoo, Inspector, Gold Coast Police Force
 Vigilant Belfon, Sub-Inspector, British Guiana Police Force
 Osmond Frederick Bower, Assistant Superintendent, Hong Kong Police Force
 Bernard Brunton  Assistant Superintendent, Federation of Malaya Police Volunteer Reserve
 Thomas Herbert Bush, Superintendent, Northern Rhodesia Police Force
 Cheng Hui Eng, alias J. Cheng, Inspector, Singapore Police Force
 Harry Conway, Senior Assistant Superintendent, Aden Police Force
 Daud bin Abu, Sergeant, Federation of Malaya Special Constabulary
 Michael Henry Day, Assistant Superintendent, Federation of Malaya Police Force
 Stanley Drapkin  Assistant Superintehdent, Federation of Malaya Police Force
 Harold Patrick Duke, Superintendent, Gold Coast Police Force
 Ernest Camm Field, District Commandant, Kenya Police Reserve
 Neville Anthony Ramon Fortune, Chief Inspector, Trinidad Police Force
 Dijara Grumah, Sergeant Gold Coast Police Forces
 Amadu Hadeija, Sergeant Major, Nigeria Police Force
 Mohamed Haris Bin Abdul Ghani, Sergeant, Federation of Malaya Special Constabulary
 Henry Wylfle Edwards Heath, Assistant Commissioner, Hong Kong Police Force
 Edgar Robert Hill  Commandant, Hong Kong Special Constabulary
 John, Ernest Hodge, Senior Superintendent, Nigeria Police Force
 Edgar Ewan Horne, Superintendent, Kenya Police Force
 Francis Gerard Howell, Assistant Superintendent, Federation of Malaya Police Force
 Nasmith Baliol Livingstone Hughes, Sergeant, British Guiana Police Force
 Stylianos Iacovou, District Sergeant Major, Cyprus Police Force
 Benjamin Igwah, Sergeant Major, Nigeria Police Force
 Tomasi Isingoma, Sub-Inspector, Uganda Police Force
 Ismail Bin Abdullah, Company Sergeant Major, Federation of Malaya Police Force
 Mohamed Ismail son of Meerasah, Detective Sub-Inspector, Federation of Malaya Police Force
 Trevor Westover Jenkins, Acting Senior Superintendent, Kenya Police Force
 Claude Randolph Keats  Honorary Inspector, Auxiliary Police, Federation of Malaya
 Eugene Kenneth Keazor, Assistant Superintendent, Nigeria Police Force
 Charles Herbert Keir, Acting Assistant Commissioner, Tanganyika Police Force
 Adetunji Kester, Chief Inspector, Nigeria Police Force
 Ben Bulam Khan Khanizaman, Inspector, North Borneo Police Force
 Wainwright Hilton Earl King, Sub-Inspector, British Guiana Police Force
 Kok Soo, Inspector, Singapore Police Force
 Lee Keng Jin, Inspector, Federation of Malaya Police Force
 Eric Hugh Lindsey, Acting Superintendent, Kenya Police Force
 Stephen Montague Locke, Senior Superintendent, Uganda Police Force
 Major John William Elliott Mackenzie  Senior Superintendent, Tanganyika Police Force
 Haitham Abdulla Maisari, Chief Inspector, Aden Armed Police Force
 Donald Matheson, Senior Superintendent, Nigeria Police Force
 William George Morrison, Assistant Superintendent, Federation of Malaya Police Force
 Muslim Bin Mohamed Som, Sub-Inspector, Singapore Police Force
 Mustafa Bin Kassim, Sergeant, Federation of Malaya Police Force
 Jameson Mweu Musyoki, Chief Inspector, Kenya Police Force
 Bernard Harold Nealon, Senior Assistant Superintendent, Sierra Leone Police Force
 No Chew Shee, Honorary Assistant Superintendent, Federation of Malaya Police Volunteer Reserve
 Yakobo Olwenyi, son of Pkum, Head Constable Major, Uganda Police Force
 Othman Bin Abdullah, Sergeant, Federation of Malaya Special Constabulary
 Leslie Howard Outram, Superintendent, Trinidad Police Force
 Fombe Pacha, Sergeant-Major, Nigeria Police Force
 Brigadier Patrick John Tottenham Pickthall  Superintendent, Grenada Police Force
 Leslie Thomas Pridgeon, Acting Superintendent, Kenya Police Force
 Ian Saxby Proud, Senior Superintendent, Nigeria Police Force
 Peter Audley Delme Radcliffe, Honorary Inspector, Auxiliary Police, Federation of Malaya
 Abdul Rahman Bin Kamaludin, Sub-Inspector, Federation of Malaya Police Force
 Roy James Randell, Superintendent, Northern Rhodesia Police Force
 Gerald Clunies-Ross, Assistant Commandant, Singapore Volunteer Special Constabulary
 Albert Alexander Shaw, Assistant Superintendent, Hong Kong Police Force
 Gurbachan Singh, son of Sucha Singh, Sub-Inspector, Federation of Malaya Police Force
 Jodh Singh, son of Sundar Singh, Chief Inspector, Kenya Police Force
 Sardar Singh, Assistant Superintendent, Singapore Police Force
 Peter Romanov Sokolov, Honorary Inspector, Auxiliary Police, Federation of Malaya
 Athanassis Stavrou, Sergeant, Cyprus Police Force
 Peter Stephen Albert Steenkamp, Superintendent, Kenya Police Force
 Ian Turnbull Stevenson  Honorary Inspector, Auxiliary Police, Federation of Malaya
 Major Ronald Audley Stoute, Deputy Commissioner, Barbados Police Force
 Mohamed Taha Bin Abdul Jalil, Inspector, Federation of Malaya Police Force
 Mikili Tembo, Sub-Inspector, Northern Rhodesia Police Force
 Krishnan Theavathasan, Detective Sub-Inspector, Singapore Police Force
 Robert Clifton Thom, Acting Superintendent, Federation of Malaya Police Force
 Mervyn Douglas Alwyne Thomson, Superintendent, Nyasaland Police Force
 Voon Kian Len, Honorary Inspector, Auxiliary Police, Federation of Malaya
 William Joseph Wall, Assistant Superintendent, Federation of Malaya Police Force
 Musa Wangara, Sergeant, Gold Coast Police Force
 Lubert Watkins, Sub-Inspector, British Guiana Police Force
 John Weekley  Honorary Inspector, Auxiliary Police, Federation of Malaya
 Edward John Hugo Colchester-Wemyss, Superintendent, British Solomon Islands Protectorate Police Force
 Frank James Wilson, Staff Officer to the Commissioner of Police, Federation of Malaya
 Frederick Edward Woodriffe, Superintendent, Jamaica Constabulary
 Ya'acob Bin Bakri, Sub-Inspector, Federation of Malaya Police Force
 Mohamed Yusof Bin Salleh, Sub-Inspector, Singapore Police Force
 Mohammed Yusuf, Senior Superintendent Inspector of Police, Tanganyika Police Force

New Zealand

Ceylon

Pakistan

References 

1953
1953 in the United Kingdom
1953 awards
Honours